This is a list of notable individuals who come from the state of Illinois, a state within the larger United States of America.

A
Aa–Ag

Emma Abbott (1850–91), opera soprano. Born and raised in Illinois until age 16; funeral held in Illinois, but interred in Massachusetts.
David Abidor (born 1992), soccer player
Margaret Abbott (1878–1955), first modern-era Olympic United States female champion. Lived during her teens and learned her Olympic sport of golf in Illinois.
Robert Sengstacke Abbott (1868–1940), African-American lawyer, newspaper publisher and editor. Studied law and had his newspaper career in Chicago.
Jessica Abel (1969–living), comic book writer and artist. Born and educated in Illinois.
Gertrude Abercrombie (1909–77), surrealist painter. Lived most of her life in Chicago and known for her association with the city.
Max Abramovitz (1908–2004), architect. Born and college-educated in Illinois.
Ben Abruzzo (1930–85), balloonist. Born and college-educated in Illinois.
Tony Accardo (1906–1992), organized crime figure. Born and lived entire life in Chicago metropolitan area.
Barbara Acklin (1943–98), singer. Came to Illinois at age of five and resided until her death.
Ron Acks (1944–living), NFL linebacker 1968–76. Acks was born, attended high school and college in Illinois.
Valdas Adamkus (1926–living), president of Lithuania 1998–2009. Lived in Illinois for a number of years after emigrating to the United States from Lithuania, getting a college degree and entering Chicago politics.
Berle Adams (1917–2009), founder of Mercury Records. Born and lived first thirty years in Illinois.
Franklin P. Adams (1881–1960), writer, member of Algonquin Round Table. Described as "a native of Chicago", he found fame and lived most of his life in New York.
John Hicks Adams (1820–78), gunslinger, Wild West lawman. Born and attended college in Illinois.
Katrina Adams (1968–living), president of United States Tennis Association. Born and educated in Illinois.
Jane Addams, social worker, teacher, Nobel Peace Prize recipient
George Ade, author and cartoonist (born in Indiana)
Paul Adelstein, actor, Prison Break, Private Practice
Victor Adeyanju, NFL defensive end 2006–10
Dankmar Adler, architect (born in Germany)
David Adler, architect (born in Wisconsin)
Max Adler, founder of Adler Planetarium
Scott Adsit, actor, writer, improvisational comedian, 30 Rock, Big Hero 6
John Agar, actor, Sands of Iwo Jima, She Wore a Yellow Ribbon, husband of Shirley Temple
Alex Agase, football player for Cleveland Browns; head coach of Northwestern, Purdue
Lou Agase, football player for Illinois, coach of CFL's Toronto Argonauts
Milton Ager, composer, "Ain't She Sweet", "Happy Days Are Here Again"
Benjamin Agosto, ice dancer, 2006 Turin Olympics silver medalist
Mark Aguirre, forward for DePaul, NBA's Dallas Mavericks and Detroit Pistons; top pick of 1981 NBA draft

Ah–Am

Gene Ahern, cartoonist
Joe Aiello, organized crime figure (born in Sicily)
Joseph Aiuppa, organized crime figure
Stan Albeck, basketball head coach, Bradley, Cleveland Cavaliers, San Antonio Spurs, Chicago Bulls
Abraham Adrian Albert, mathematician
Eddie Albert, Oscar-nominated actor, Green Acres, Switch, Oklahoma!, Roman Holiday, The Heartbreak Kid, The Longest Yard
Frankie Albert, quarterback and head coach for San Francisco 49ers, College Football Hall of Famer
Bruce Alberts, biochemist, original author of Molecular Biology of the Cell
Steve Albini, musician, producer
Ted Albrecht, offensive tackle for Purdue and Chicago Bears
James L. Alcorn, governor and U.S. Senator of Mississippi
Jody Alderson, swimmer, 1952 Olympic bronze medalist
Dorothy Aldis, children's author
Gus Alex, organized crime figure
Dan Alexander, football player, 2000 Alamo Bowl MVP
Houston Alexander, mixed martial artist
Linsey Alexander, blues musician (born in Mississippi)
Lorez Alexandria, jazz and gospel singer
Nelson Algren, author, The Man with the Golden Arm, A Walk on the Wild Side (born in Michigan)
Saul Alinsky, founder of modern community organizing and writer
Brian Allard, MLB pitcher 1979–81
Jeff Allen, offensive guard for Kansas City Chiefs
Joan Allen, Oscar-nominated actress, The Bourne Ultimatum, The Contender, The Upside of Anger, Nixon, Face/Off
Karen Allen, actress, Indiana Jones and the Kingdom of the Crystal Skull, Raiders of the Lost Ark, Animal House, Scrooged
Leo E. Allen, 14-term U.S. Representative
Leslie Allen, auto racer, 9th in 1930 Indianapolis 500
Rex Allen Jr., country singer, narrator of film Me, Myself and Irene
Ronnie Allen, professional pool player
Sandy Allen, tallest U.S. woman
Steve Allen, television personality, actor, author, songwriter, first host of The Tonight Show (born in New York)
Tony Allen, forward for Memphis Grizzlies
William J. Allen, judge, U.S. Representative (born in Tennessee)
Justin Allgaier, auto racer, 2008 ARCA RE/MAX Series champion
Fran Allison, radio-TV personality, Kukla, Fran and Ollie (born in Iowa)
Luther Allison, blues musician (born in Arkansas)
Samuel Allison, prominent physicist who worked on Manhattan Project
Arthur Allyn Jr., co-owner of Chicago White Sox in 1960s
John Allyn, owner of White Sox 1961–75
Mike Alstott, fullback for Tampa Bay Buccaneers 1996–2007, Super Bowl XXXVII champion
Michael J. Alter, real estate developer, owner of WNBA's Chicago Sky
John Peter Altgeld, Governor of Illinois 1893–97 (born in Germany)
Dave Altizer, MLB infielder 1906–11
Scott Altman, astronaut, four Space Shuttle missions
John Altschuler, screenwriter, Blades of Glory, Silicon Valley
Anita Alvarez, Cook County State's Attorney
John Alvin, actor, The Beast with Five Fingers, Objective, Burma!
A.A. Ames, 4-term mayor of Minneapolis
Edward Ames, founder, McKendree University (born in Ohio)
Knowlton Ames, college football player and coach
Rosemary Ames, actress, Our Little Girl, Pursued
Stephen E. Ambrose, author, historian, Band of Brothers
The American Breed, band, "Bend Me, Shape Me"
Warren Amling, Ohio State athlete in College Football Hall of Fame
Albert Ammons, jazz musician
Gene Ammons, jazz musician
Morey Amsterdam, actor and comedian, The Dick Van Dyke Show

An–Ar

Merry Anders, actress, The Dalton Girls, Hear Me Good, Tickle Me
Arthur E. Andersen, founder of accounting firm
Alexandria Anderson, NCAA champion sprinter
Andree Anderson, ice dancer, member of Figure Skating Hall of Fame
Craig Anderson, goaltender for Ottawa Senators
Gillian Anderson, Emmy Award-winning actress, The X-Files, The House of Mirth, Bleak House, Hannibal
J. J. Anderson, forward for Bradley and Utah Jazz
John B. Anderson, politician, U.S. Representative 1961–81, U.S. presidential candidate
Ken Anderson, NFL quarterback 1971–86, four-time Pro Bowl selection
Kevin Anderson, actor, Sleeping with the Enemy, Miles from Home, Hoffa
Kurt Anderson, football player and coach
Laurie Anderson, performance artist and musician
Les Anderson, auto racer, 11th in 1947 Indy 500
Margaret C. Anderson, editor and publisher (born in Indiana)
Nick Anderson, guard for Orlando Magic and Sacramento Kings
Philip Warren Anderson, Nobel Prize-winning physicist
Ray Anderson, musician
Robert Orville Anderson, founder of ARCO oil company
Sherwood Anderson, novelist
Walter Stratton Anderson, naval vice admiral, battleship commander
Fern Andra, circus performer, actress, director
Emil Andres, auto racer, drove in nine Indianapolis 500s
Bruce Andrews, poet
Stanley Andrews, actor
Ethel Percy Andrus, founder of AARP
Elmer Angsman, running back for Notre Dame, Chicago Cardinals
John Ankerberg, Christian evangelist, TV presenter
Morris Ankrum, actor
Ann-Margret, Oscar-nominated actress, Bye Bye Birdie, Viva Las Vegas, Carnal Knowledge, The Cincinnati Kid, Tommy (born in Sweden)
Beulah Annan, inspiration for "Roxie Hart" in play and film Chicago
Moses Annenberg, newspaper publisher (born in Prussia)
Frank Annunzio, politician (Democrat), 13-term U.S. Representative
Cap Anson, Hall of Fame infielder for Chicago White Stockings (born in Iowa)
Luis Aparicio, Hall of Fame infielder for Chicago White Sox (born in Venezuela)
Clarence Applegran, basketball coach, Kentucky 1924–25
Amy Applegren, pro baseball player
Arthur I. Appleton, businessman, thoroughbred owner
Luke Appling, Hall of Fame infielder for White Sox (born in North Carolina)
Lee Archambault, astronaut
Robert Ardrey, playwright and screenwriter, Khartoum, The Three Musketeers
Leslie C. Arends, politician (Republican), U.S. Representative 1943–74, Majority and Minority Whip
Mark Arie, two gold medals in shooting at 1920 Olympics
Hub Arkush, publisher of Pro Football Weekly
Andrew Watson Armour III, meat-packing executive, philanthropist
Philip Danforth Armour, businessman, founder of Armour and Company (born in New York)
Terron Armstead, NFL offensive lineman
Matthew John Armstrong, actor, Heroes
Otis Armstrong, running back for Denver Broncos 1973–80
Billy Arnold, auto racer, won 1930 Indianapolis 500
Billy Boy Arnold, blues musician
Isaac N. Arnold, U.S. Representative, author (born in New York)
Cliff Arquette, comedian and actor (born in Ohio)
Lewis Arquette, actor, Sherlock Hound, Camp Candy, The Waltons
Patricia Arquette, Oscar and Emmy-winning actress, Boyhood, Medium, True Romance, CSI: Cyber
Gerry Arrigo, MLB pitcher 1961–70

As–Az

Jon Asamoah, offensive guard for Atlanta Falcons
Diandra Asbaty, bowler
Tom Ashbrook, NPR personality
John Ashcroft, politician (Republican), U.S. Attorney General 2001–05, Missouri senator and governor
Darryl Ashmore, NFL tackle 1992–2002
James N. Ashmore, basketball coach, North Carolina, Iowa, Washington State, DePauw
Ed Asner, actor, The Mary Tyler Moore Show, Up, Elf (born in Missouri)
Mary Astor, Oscar-winning actress, The Maltese Falcon, Dodsworth, Meet Me in St. Louis, The Great Lie
Joe Astroth, MLB catcher 1945–56
Ira Aten, lawman, Texas Ranger
Doug Atkins, defensive end for Chicago Bears 1955–66, Hall of Fame (born in Tennessee)
Smith D. Atkins, editor, Civil War colonel (born in New York)
Edith Atwater, actress, True Grit, Family Plot, The Body Snatcher
Richard and Florence Atwater, co-authors of Mr. Popper's Penguins
Steve Atwater, twice Super Bowl champion with Denver Broncos
James T. Aubrey Jr., television executive, president of CBS
David Auburn, playwright, Proof
Jean M. Auel, author, The Clan of the Cave Bear
James Augustine, center for Illinois' 2005 NCAA runners-up
Jeff Austin, mandolinist, singer
Lovie Austin, jazz musician (born in Tennessee)
Jason Avant, NFL wide receiver
Charles Avery, silent film actor, Keystone Kops
Sewell Avery, chairman of Montgomery Ward, first president of Museum of Science and Industry (born in Michigan)
John Avildsen, Oscar-winning film director, Rocky, Save the Tiger, Lean on Me, The Karate Kid
David Axelrod, political advisor to Presidents Bill Clinton and Barack Obama, author, TV commentator
Brendon Ayanbadejo, NFL linebacker 1999–2012
Marion Aye, silent-film actress
David Ayer, screenwriter and director, Training Day, End of Watch, Fury
Edward E. Ayer, benefactor and first president of Field Museum of Natural History (born in Massachusetts)
Harriet Hubbard Ayer, 19th-century cosmetics maven, journalist
Bill Ayers, founder and member of Weather Underground
Reiko Aylesworth, actress, Michelle Dessler on 24
Agnes Ayres, silent-film actress
Irving Azoff, music executive, head of Ticketmaster, Live Nation Entertainment

B
Ba–Bd
 

Richard Bach, author, Jonathan Livingston Seagull
Charlie Bachman, football coach, Kansas State, Florida, Michigan State
Bill Bachrach, Olympic swim coach
Henry Bacon, architect of the Lincoln Memorial
Mary Bacon, jockey
Benjamin F. Bailar, United States Postmaster General 1975–78
Chantal Bailey, Olympic speed skater
Cory Bailey, MLB pitcher 1993–2002
Willis J. Bailey, Governor of Kansas 1903–05
Barbara Bain, actress, Mission: Impossible
Harold Baines, outfielder, coach for Chicago White Sox (born in Maryland)
Butch Baird, pro golfer
Leah Baird, silent-film actress
David J. Baker, judge, U.S. Senator for 29 days (born in Connecticut)
David J. Baker Jr., 19th-century judge
Edward Dickinson Baker, U.S. Representative of Illinois, U.S. Senator of Oregon (born in England)
Jehu Baker, 19th-century politician, U.S. Representative (born in Kentucky)
Ralph Baker, Northwestern halfback in College Football Hall of Fame
LaVern Baker, singer in Rock and Roll Hall of Fame
A. J. Balaban, theater owner and showman
Barney Balaban, Hollywood studio chief
Bob Balaban, actor, Gosford Park, Close Encounters of the Third Kind, Catch-22, Waiting for Guffman
Frank Balasz, NFL running back 1939–45
Marcelo Balboa, pro soccer player
H.C. Baldridge, Governor of Idaho 1927–31
Adam Baldwin, actor, voice actor, blogger, Chuck, Full Metal Jacket, Serenity, My Bodyguard
Rosecrans Baldwin, novelist, essayist
George Ball, diplomat, adviser to JFK and LBJ, U.S. Ambassador to United Nations
Carl Ballantine, magician, comedian, actor, McHale's Navy
Edwin Balmer, editor of Redbook magazine
Eddie Bane, MLB pitcher and executive
Ted Banker, NFL lineman 1983–91
Ernie Banks, 19-year infielder for Chicago Cubs, in Baseball Hall of Fame (born in Texas)
Kelcie Banks, boxer, 1987 Pan American Games champion
Jerry Barber, golfer, winner of 1961 PGA Championship
Curt Barclay, MLB pitcher 1957–59
Paris Barclay, Emmy-winning TV director and producer, In Treatment, NYPD Blue, Cold Case
John Bardeen, winner of two Nobel Prizes in Physics (born in Wisconsin)
Jesse Barfield, outfielder for Toronto Blue Jays and New York Yankees 1981–92
Ike Barinholtz, actor, comedian, voice actor, Mad TV, The Mindy Project, The Awesomes
Al Barlick, Hall of Fame baseball umpire
Brandon Barnes, rock musician in band Rise Against
Brenda C. Barnes, CEO of Sara Lee and PepsiCo
Edward Larrabee Barnes, architect
Margaret Ayer Barnes, Pulitzer Prize-winning novelist
Charlene Barnett, pro baseball player
Robert Barnett, attorney
Carol Ross Barney, architect
Dale Barnstable, basketball player for Kentucky, banned by NBA
Tony Barone, basketball coach, Creighton, Texas A&M and NBA's Memphis Grizzlies
Bea Barrett, golfer
The Barrett Sisters, gospel singers
Barbara Barrie, Oscar-nominated, Tony Award-winning actress, Barney Miller, Breaking Away
George Barris, auto customizer, created TV's Batmobile
Ed Barrow, baseball manager, executive
John Barrowman, actor, singer, dancer (born in Scotland)
Jimmy Barry, 19th-century boxing champion
Norman Barry, head coach of 1925 NFL champion Chicago Cardinals, judge
Viola Barry, silent-film actress
Dick Bartell, shortstop, played in three World Series
William Bartholomay, owned baseball's Milwaukee and Atlanta Braves
Bonnie Bartlett, actress, St. Elsewhere (born in Wisconsin)
Peter Bartlett, actor, One Life to Live
Dan Barton, actor
Dick Barwegan, MLB outfielder 1947–54
Burt Baskin, co-founder of Baskin-Robbins
Mary Bass, editor of Ladies' Home Journal 1936–63
Granville Bates, actor
Bates Battaglia, NHL winger 1997–2008
Sam Battaglia, organized crime figure
Kenny Battle, player for four NBA teams
Lloyd Batts, pro basketball player
Hank Bauer, outfielder and manager, New York Yankees, Kansas City A's; decorated World War II U.S. Marine
Sybil Bauer, swimmer, gold medalist at 1924 Summer Olympics
Tom Baugh, center for Southern Illinois and Kansas City Chiefs
H. R. Baukhage, news broadcaster
Harry Neal Baum, ad executive, author (born in South Dakota)
L. Frank Baum, creator of The Wonderful Wizard of Oz, Chicago journalist (born in New York)
Ross Baumgarten, MLB pitcher 1978–82
Stan Baumgartner, MLB pitcher 1914–26 (born in Texas)
Harry Bay, baseball player and bandleader
Nora Bayes, actress, singer and songwriter, "Shine On, Harvest Moon"
Rick Bayless, chef and Chicago restaurateur (born in Oklahoma)
Beverly Bayne, silent-film actress (born in Minnesota)

Be–Bg

Jennifer Beals, actress, Flashdance, The L Word, The Bride, Devil in a Blue Dress, The Book of Eli
Harry P. Beam, U.S. Representative 1931–42
Todd Beamer, heroic passenger on United 93 on 9/11 (born in Michigan)
Melissa Bean, U.S. Representative 2005–11
Warren A. Bechtel, founder of Bechtel
Boom-Boom Beck, MLB pitcher 1924–45
Fred Beck, MLB player 1909–15
John Beck, actor, The Other Side of Midnight, Rollerball, Dallas
Marilyn Beck, syndicated columnist
George Becker, labor leader
Kurt Becker, lineman for Michigan and Chicago Bears
Rich Becker, MLB outfielder 1993–2000
Arnold Orville Beckman, chemist and inventor
Robert Todd Lincoln Beckwith, great-grandson of Abraham Lincoln
Hal Bedsole, tight end, College Football Hall of Fame
Don Beebe, wide receiver for Buffalo Bills and Super Bowl XXXI champion Green Bay Packers
Fred Beebe, MLB pitcher (born in Nebraska)
June Beebe, golfer
Edward Beecher, theologian and abolitionist (born in New York)
Ken Behring, real-estate developer, owned NFL's Seattle Seahawks
Ed Beinor, NFL tackle 1939–42
Bob Bell, star of Bozo's Circus (born in Michigan)
Darryl M. Bell, actor, A Different World, Homeboys in Outer Space
Edward Price Bell, foreign correspondent
Josh Bell, third baseman for Baltimore Orioles 2010–11
Lee Phillip Bell, television personality, creator of The Young and the Restless
Rex Bell, actor, lieutenant governor of Nevada, husband of Clara Bow
William J. Bell, television producer, creator of The Bold and the Beautiful
Ralph Bellamy, Oscar-nominated actor, His Girl Friday, Sunrise at Campobello, Rosemary's Baby, Trading Places
Harry Bellaver, actor, Naked City, From Here to Eternity, Love Me or Leave Me
Dan Bellino, MLB umpire
Saul Bellow, Nobel Prize and Pulitzer Prize-winning writer, Humboldt's Gift, Seize the Day
Louis Bellson, jazz drummer, bandleader and musician
James Belushi, actor, comedian, According to Jim, Saturday Night Live, Taking Care of Business, K-9
John Belushi, actor, comedian, Saturday Night Live, Animal House, 1941, The Blues Brothers
Robert Belushi, actor 
Solon Spencer Beman, architect
Albert Benbrook, guard, College Football Hall of Fame
Bob Bender, basketball player, Indiana and Duke; head coach, Illinois State, Washington
Riley A. Bender, politician
Vincent Hugo Bendix, automotive and aviation pioneer
Chloe Bennet, actress, Agents of S.H.I.E.L.D.
Beck Bennett, comedian, Saturday Night Live
Doc Bennett, baseball manager and scout
Gary Bennett, MLB catcher 1995–2008
Rhona Bennett, singer
Harve Bennett, producer, The Six Million Dollar Man, Star Trek II: The Wrath of Khan
John W. F. Bennett, athlete and engineer
Jack Benny, iconic comedian, radio and TV personality and actor, The Jack Benny Program
Jodi Benson, actress, voice actress, singer, The Little Mermaid
Jack Berch, singer and radio personality
Pete Bercich, linebacker for Notre Dame and Minnesota Vikings
Tom Berenger, Oscar-nominated actor, Platoon, Major League, The Big Chill, Sniper, Inception
Edgar Bergen, actor and ventriloquist, You Can't Cheat an Honest Man, father of Candice Bergen
Heinie Berger, MLB pitcher 1907–10
Norma Berger, pro baseball player
Wally Berger, MLB outfielder 1930–40, four-time All-Star
Emily Bergl, actress, Men in Trees
Dave Bergman, first baseman for 1984 World Series champion Detroit Tigers
Sean Bergman, MLB pitcher 1993–2000
Nate Berkus, designer, television personality
Shelley Berman, comedian, actor, Curb Your Enthusiasm, The Best Man, Meet the Fockers
Carlos Bernard, actor, 24
Dwight Bernard, MLB pitcher 1978–82
Jason Bernard, actor, All of Me, While You Were Sleeping, Liar Liar
Ernani Bernardi, musician and politician
Joseph Bernardin, Cardinal Archbishop of the Archdiocese of Chicago
Edward Bernds, director, Return of the Fly, Queen of Outer Space
Edward Allen Bernero, TV writer, director, co-creator of Third Watch
Ken Berry, actor, F Troop, Mayberry, R.F.D., Mama's Family
Marcheline Bertrand, actress, mother of Angelina Jolie
Dick Bertell, catcher for Cubs 1960–67
Jay Berwanger, football star for University of Chicago, first winner of Heisman Trophy (born in Iowa)
William P. Bettendorf, inventor, Bettendorf, Iowa named for him
Gary Bettenhausen, auto racer, third place in 1980 Indianapolis 500
Tony Bettenhausen, auto racer, five top-10 finishes in Indy 500
Tony Bettenhausen Jr., auto racer, 7th place in 1981 Indy 500
Tom Bettis, NFL linebacker, coach
John Lourie Beveridge, Civil War officer and 16th Governor of Illinois (born in New York)
Patrick Beverley, guard for NBA's Houston Rockets

Bh–Bm

Kapri Bibbs, NFL running back
Bill Bidwill, owner of NFL's Arizona Cardinals
Charles Bidwill, owner of Chicago Cardinals 1933–47
Judy Biggert, U.S. Representative 1999–2013
Michael Bilandic, Mayor of Chicago 1976–79, chief justice of Illinois Supreme Court
George Binks, MLB outfielder 1944–48
Claude Binyon, journalist, screenwriter and film director
William Morris Bioff, organized crime figure
Andrew Bird, musician
Chris Bisaillon, college football player
Frank Biscan, MLB pitcher 1942–48
William Bissell, doctor, Governor of Illinois 1857–60 (born in New York)
Uwe Blab, basketball player (born in Germany)
Black Beaver, 19th-century scout
Black Hawk, Sauk Indian Chief
Edwin Black, columnist, author of IBM and the Holocaust
John Charles Black, Civil War general, district attorney (born in Mississippi)
Jordan Black, comedy writer, actor, Halfway Home
Karen Black, Oscar-nominated actress, The Great Gatsby, Five Easy Pieces, Airport 1975, Family Plot
Quincy Black, NFL linebacker 2007–12
Harry Blackmun, Supreme Court justice 1970–94
Harry Blackstone Sr., stage magician and illusionist
Timothy Blackstone, railroad mogul, founder of Union Stock Yards, mayor of LaSalle, Illinois
Ray Blades, MLB outfielder and manager
Rod Blagojevich, Governor of Illinois 2003–09, imprisoned in 2012
Bonnie Blair, speed skater, five-time Winter Olympics gold medalist (born in New York)
William M. Blair, financier
Zach Blair, musician, Rise Against
John Blake, football coach
Rosa Blasi, actress, Strong Medicine, Make It or Break It, Hitz
Neil Blatchford, two-time Olympian speed skater
Tony Blazine, football player for Illinois Wesleyan and Chicago Cardinals, College Football Hall of Fame
Tempestt Bledsoe, actress, Vanessa Huxtable on The Cosby Show
Tyler Blevins, better known as "Ninja", professional gamer, Twitch streamer and YouTuber 
Herbert Blitzstein, organized crime figure
Robert Bloch, writer, author of Psycho
John Rusling Block, U.S. Secretary of Agriculture 1981–86
Ike Bloom, nightclub owner during Prohibition
Sol Bloom, impresario, 14-term U.S. Representative of New York
Ossie Bluege, MLB player and manager
Deborah Blum, journalist and author
Sidney Blumenthal, journalist, aide to President Bill Clinton
Jimmy Blythe, musician and composer

Bn–Bo

Harold P. Boas, mathematician
Michael Boatman, actor, writer, Spin City, China Beach, Arliss
Ryan Boatright, basketball player
Nicole Bobek, figure skater, 1995 national champion
Bucky Bockhorn, basketball player and broadcaster
Tom Bodett, ad spokesman for Motel 6
Samuel Bodman, politician (Republican), U.S. Secretary of Energy 2005–09
Tom Boerwinkle, center for Chicago Bulls 1968–78, broadcaster (born in Ohio)
Budd Boetticher, film director, The Tall T, The Killer Is Loose, Seven Men from Now
Clarence John Boettiger, journalist, son-in-law of FDR
Tim Bogar, MLB infielder 1993–2001 (born in Indiana)
Bill Bogash, pioneer of Roller Derby
Suzy Bogguss, country singer
David Boies, attorney
Charles Bolles, aka Black Bart, stagecoach bandit
Bob Boken, MLB infielder 1933–34
John Boles, MLB manager and executive
Eric Bolling, anchor at the Fox Business Network, co-host of The Five
Don Bollweg, first baseman for 1953 World Series champion Yankees
Shadrach Bond, first Governor of Illinois (born in Maryland)
Beulah Bondi, Oscar-nominated actress, Mr. Smith Goes to Washington, It's a Wonderful Life (born in Indiana)
Winifred Bonfils, early 20th-century journalist (born in Wisconsin)
Mildred A. Bonham, journalist
Skeeter Bonn, country musician
Bonnie Lou, singer
Ron Bontemps, captain of 1952 Olympic gold-medal basketball team
Ed Boon, creator of Mortal Kombat video game
Levi Boone, former Mayor of Chicago of Know-Nothing Party (born in Kentucky)
William Borah, 33-year U.S. Senator of Idaho
George Bork, Northern Illinois quarterback, Hall of Fame
Bruce Borland, golf course designer
Alex Borstein, actress, Family Guy
Tom Bosley, actor, Happy Days, Father Dowling Mysteries, Murder, She Wrote
Cathy Boswell, basketball player
Jim Bottomley, Hall of Fame first baseman for St. Louis Cardinals
Lou Boudreau, Hall of Fame shortstop, manager, broadcaster
Peter Bourjos, MLB outfielder
Mel Bourne, Oscar-nominated art designer
Dick Boushka, 1956 Olympic basketball gold medalist
Henry S. Boutell, U.S. Representative 1897–1911 (born in Massachusetts)
Charles Bowden, non-fiction author, journalist, essayist
Michael Bowden, pitcher for Boston Red Sox 2008–12
Louise DeKoven Bowen, suffragist, philanthropist
Matt Bowen, safety for four NFL teams
Roger Bowen, actor, M*A*S*H, charter member of Second City
Jon Bowermaster, adventurer, National Geographic oceans expert
Ken Bowman, center for Super Bowl I and II champion Green Bay Packers
Charles Box, first African-American mayor of Rockford
Bruce Boxleitner, actor, science fiction novelist, Babylon 5, Scarecrow and Mrs. King, the Tron films
Charles Boyce, syndicated cartoonist (born in Mississippi)
William D. Boyce, founder of Boy Scouts of America (born in Pennsylvania)
Guy Boyd, actor, Streamers, Body Double
William W. Boyington, architect of Chicago Water Tower, mayor of Highland Park (born in Massachusetts)
Ronnie Boykins, jazz musician
Lara Flynn Boyle, actress, The Practice, Twin Peaks, The Temp, Men in Black II
Walter J. Boyne, Air Force pilot, author, historian, director of National Air and Space Museum
Megan Bozek, hockey player, 2014 Winter Olympics silver medalist

Br–Bt

Emil J. Brach, candy mogul
Helen Brach, candy heiress, presumed murder victim (born in Ohio)
Ray Bradbury, science-fiction author, Fahrenheit 451, The Illustrated Man, Something Wicked This Way Comes
Harold Bradley Jr., football player and actor
Lydia Moss Bradley, philanthropist, founder of Bradley University (born in Indiana)
Phil Bradley, college football and pro baseball player (born in Indiana)
Morris Bradshaw, wide receiver for Oakland Raiders 1974–81
Sufe Bradshaw, actress, Veep
James B. Bradwell, judge (born in England)
Myra Bradwell, state's first female lawyer (born in Vermont)
Ed Brady, linebacker for three NFL teams
James Brady, advisor and White House press secretary to Ronald Reagan
Neville Brand, actor, D.O.A., Love Me Tender, The Untouchables, Birdman of Alcatraz
Mark Staff Brandl, art critic, reviewer for Art in America
Marlon Brando, Oscar-winning actor, The Godfather, Last Tango in Paris, Apocalypse Now (born in Nebraska)
Mac Brandt, actor, Prison Break
Erik Brann, guitarist with Iron Butterfly
Oscar Brashear, jazz musician
Cameron Brate, tight end for Tampa Bay Buccaneers
Zeke Bratkowski, NFL quarterback and coach
Andre Braugher, actor, Homicide: Life on the Street, Hack, Men of a Certain Age, Brooklyn Nine-Nine
Ben Braun, basketball coach, Rice, Cal, Eastern Michigan
Carol Moseley Braun, first African-American female U.S. Senator
Tamara Braun, soap opera actress
Anthony Braxton, jazz musician
Henry Skillman Breckinridge, attorney in Charles Lindbergh kidnap case, Olympic fencer
Brent Brede, MLB outfielder 1996–98
Richard L. Breen, Oscar-winning screenwriter
Sidney Breese, judge, U.S. Senator, advocate of Illinois Central railroad
Buddy Bregman, music arranger
Edward A. Brennan, president and CEO of Sears, Roebuck & Co. 1980–95
Kathleen Brennan, songwriter, producer, wife of Tom Waits
Josh Brent, nose tackle for Dallas Cowboys
Jerry Bresler, songwriter, "Five Guys Named Moe"
Carl Brettschneider, NFL linebacker 1956–63
Jim Brewer, basketball player, 1972 Olympics and Cleveland Cavaliers
Ralph Breyer, swimmer, 1924 Olympic gold medalist
Jack Brickhouse, Hall of Fame baseball broadcaster
Paul Brickman, writer-director, Risky Business, Men Don't Leave
Donald Briggs, actor
Nancy Brinker, ambassador, winner of Presidential Medal of Freedom
John Briscoe, pitcher for Oakland A's 1991–96
Nicole Briscoe, sportscaster, Miss Teen Illinois 1998 (born in Wisconsin)
Frank Brisko, auto racer, 12 times in Indianapolis 500
Paul Brittain, actor, comedian, cast member on Saturday Night Live
Frederick A. Britten, 22-year U.S. Representative
David Broder, journalist, author, 1973 Pulitzer Prize-winning Washington Post columnist
Charles W. Brooks, World War I veteran, U.S. Senator of Illinois 1940–49
Gwendolyn Brooks, poet (born in Kansas)
Phil Brooks, professional wrestler and WWE Champion under ring name "CM Punk"
Bill Brown, fullback for Minnesota Vikings, four-time Pro Bowl selection
Bobbi Brown, CEO of Bobbi Brown Cosmetics
Buck Brown, cartoonist
Chelsea Brown, actress, Rowan & Martin's Laugh-In
Chris Brown, NFL running back 2003–09
Corwin Brown, defensive back, coach for New England Patriots
Dee Brown, guard for Illinois 2005 NCAA basketball tournament runners-up
Emil Brown, MLB outfielder 1997–2009
Jason Brown, figure skater, 2015 U.S. champion
Jesse Brown, U.S. Secretary of Veterans' Affairs 1993–97 (born in Michigan)
Lorenzo Brown (born 1990), basketball player in the Israeli Basketball Premier League
Mike Brown, wing for San Jose Sharks
Nancy Elizabeth Brown, highly decorated U.S. Navy Vice Admiral
Oscar Brown, songwriter
Patrick Brown, offensive tackle for Carolina Panthers
Peter Brown, songwriter, "Material Girl"
Roy Brown, children's entertainer, The Bozo Show, Garfield Goose and Friends (born in Arizona)
Sergio Brown, safety for Indianapolis Colts
Shannon Brown, guard for eight NBA teams
Theotis Brown, NFL running back 1979–83
Tony Brown, NBA player and coach
Warren Brown, early 20th-century sportswriter
Orville Hickman Browning, completed U.S. Senate term of Stephen A. Douglas, U.S. Secretary of Interior (born in Kentucky)
David Bruce, actor, The Mad Ghoul, Lady on a Train
Hank Bruder, NFL guard 1931–39, Green Bay Packers Hall of Fame
Don Brumm, NFL defensive tackle 1963–72
Avery Brundage, athlete, decathlon and pentathlon, President of International Olympic Committee 1952–72
Liz Brunner, television journalist, 1979 Miss Illinois
Doug Bruno, women's basketball coach, DePaul University, 2012 U.S. Olympic team
Hal Bruno, political journalist
Jalen Brunson, basketball player
Milton Brunson, gospel musician
Charles W. Bryan, mayor of Lincoln, Nebraska 1915–17 and 2-term Governor of Nebraska
Johnny Bryan, pro football player and team owner
William Jennings Bryan, politician (Democrat), U.S. Secretary of State 1913–15, presidential candidate 1896, 1900, 1908
Corbin Bryant, NFL player for Buffalo Bills
Em Bryant, guard for 1969 NBA champion Boston Celtics
Kelci Bryant, diver, silver medalist at 2012 London Olympics
Rosalyn Bryant, sprinter, silver medalist at 1976 Summer Olympics
Bob Bryar, musician, My Chemical Romance drummer

Bu–Bz

Ray Buchanan, NFL defensive back 1993–2004
Frank Buck, hunter, zookeeper, actor (born in Texas)
Bob Buckhorn, mayor of Tampa, Florida
The Buckinghams, pop group, "Kind of a Drag"
Tom Buckingham, film director
Quinn Buckner, basketball player, winner of high school, NCAA, Olympic and NBA championships
John Carl Buechler, horror movie writer/director, special effects artist
Doug Buffone, linebacker for Chicago Bears, sportscaster (born in Pennsylvania)
John Buford, Civil War general (born in Kentucky)
Napoleon Bonaparte Buford, Civil War general (born in Kentucky)
Bryan Bulaga, offensive tackle for Green Bay Packers
Richard Bull, actor, Little House on the Prairie, Voyage to the Bottom of the Sea
Storm Bull, musician
John Whitfield Bunn, financier, treasurer of Abe Lincoln campaign (born in New Jersey)
Elbridge Ayer Burbank, artist
Horatio C. Burchard, director of U.S. Mint 1879–85, U.S. Representative 1869–79 (born in New York)
Jacob Burck, cartoonist for Chicago Sun-Times 1938–1982 (born in Poland)
Hannibal Buress, stand-up comedian, actor, The Eric Andre Show, Broad City
Anne M. Burke, Illinois Supreme Court justice, co-founder of Special Olympics
Bobby Burke, MLB pitcher 1927–37
Edward M. Burke, politician (Democrat), Chicago alderman
Johnny Burke, lyricist in Songwriters Hall of Fame (born in California)
Kathleen Burke, actress, Island of Lost Souls, The Lives of a Bengal Lancer
Leo Burnett, advertising executive
W. R. Burnett, novelist, screenwriter, Little Caesar, Nobody Lives Forever, High Sierra (born in Ohio)
Smiley Burnette, country singer and musician, Western actor
Daniel H. Burnham, architect, Chicago city planner (born in New York)
Heather Burns, actress, Bored to Death, Miss Congeniality and its sequel
Ronnie Burns, actor, Burns and Allen
Pete Burnside, pitcher for six MLB teams
Hedy Burress, actress
Edgar Rice Burroughs, author, creator of Tarzan
Cheryl Burton, television journalist
Ed Busch, MLB infielder 1943–45
Samuel T. Busey, Civil War general, politician (born in Indiana)
Homer Bush, MLB infielder
Fred A. Busse, postmaster, Mayor of Chicago 1907–11
Cheri Bustos, U.S. Representative
Fanny Butcher, influential critic and editor
Mike Butcher, pitching coach for Arizona Diamondbacks
Drew Butera, catcher for 2015 World Series champion Kansas City Royals
Dick Butkus, Hall of Fame football player for Illinois and Chicago Bears, actor
Brett Butler, MLB outfielder 1981–97 (born in California)
Daws Butler, voice of Yogi Bear, other cartoon characters (born in Ohio)
Jerry Butler, singer, member of Rock and Roll Hall of Fame
Michael Butler, theatrical producer
Paul Butler, polo champion, founder of Oak Brook and Butler National Golf Club
Robert L. Butler, 50-year mayor of Marion, Illinois
Paul Butterfield, musician in Blues Hall of Fame and Rock and Roll Hall of Fame
Dave Butz, defensive lineman for Washington Redskins, St. Louis Cardinals, 2-time Super Bowl champion
Ernie Byfield, hotelier, founder of The Pump Room
Will Bynum (born 1983), NBA point guard 2006–15
John Byrum, screenwriter and director, Heart Beat, Duets, The Razor's Edge
Tim Byrdak, pitcher for five MLB teams
Jane Byrne, first female Mayor of Chicago
Jeff Bzdelik, associate head coach, Houston Rockets, Air Force, Colorado, Wake Forest

C
Ca–Cd

Frances Xavier Cabrini, nun, missionary, canonized saint (born in Austria)
Leon Cadore, MLB player 1915–24, pitched a record 26 innings in one game
Jack Cafferty, political commentator for CNN 2005–12
Beth Cahill, comedian
Leo Cahill, CFL coach and executive
Frank Calabrese Sr., organized crime figure
Nicholas Calabrese, organized crime figure
Ben F. Caldwell, banker, U.S. Representative 1899–1905
L. Scott Caldwell, actress, Lost, Queens Supreme
Corky Calhoun, NBA forward 1972–80
Frank Caliendo, comedian
Earnest Elmo Calkins, advertising executive
Bill Callahan, head coach of Oakland Raiders 2002–03 and University of Nebraska 2004–07
Frances Callier, actress, comedian, Hannah Montana
Sarah Wayne Callies, actress, The Walking Dead
Ann Hampton Callaway, singer and actress
John Callaway, public television journalist
Liz Callaway, singer and actress
Chris Calloway, NFL wide receiver 1990–2000
George H. Cameron, World War I general
Julia Cameron, writer, second wife of Martin Scorsese
Bruce Campbell, MLB outfielder 1930–42
Danielle Campbell, actress, The Originals
Heather Anne Campbell, comedian
Louise Campbell, actress, The Star Maker, Night Club Scandal
Tom Campbell, U.S. Representative in California 1989–2001
Marvin Camras, inventor
Larry Canada, NFL running back 1978–81
Tony Canadeo, halfback for Green Bay Packers 1941–52, Pro Football Hall of Fame
Vincent Canby, film critic
Glenn Canfield Jr., metallurgist and businessman
Joe Cannon, politician (Republican), Speaker of the House 1903–11 (born in North Carolina)
Kay Cannon, screenwriter
Jim Cantalupo, CEO of McDonald's Corporation 1991–2004
Shorty Cantlon, runner-up in 1930 Indianapolis 500, killed in 1947 race
Homaro Cantu, restaurateur (born in Washington)
Dominique Canty, pro basketball player
Al Capone, gangster, bootlegger, boss of Chicago Outfit, subject of Capone, The Untouchables (born in New York)
Frank Capone, organized crime figure, brother of Al (born in New York)
John Caponera, comedian, actor, The Good Life
Antonio "Tony Bananas" Caponigro, consigliere of Angelo Bruno in Philadelphia crime family
Buzz Capra, MLB pitcher 1971–77
The Caravans, gospel singers
Perry Caravello, Comedian, skateboarder, and star of Windy City Heat (born in Park Ridge)
Harry Caray, Hall of Fame broadcaster for Chicago White Sox and Chicago Cubs (born in Missouri)
Brian Cardinal, forward for six NBA teams
Steve Carell, actor and comedian, Second City alumnus (born in Massachusetts)
Gabe Carimi (born 1988), All-American and NFL football player
Thomas Carlin, Governor of Illinois 1838–42; Carlinville named for him (born in Kentucky)
Amy Carlson, actress, Third Watch, Blue Bloods
Hal Carlson, MLB pitcher 1917–30
Mark Carlson, MLB umpire
John P. Carmichael, sportswriter
Chuck Carney, football and basketball All-American
Sue Carol, talent agent, wife of Alan Ladd
J. C. Caroline, halfback for Illinois, defensive back for Chicago Bears
Ed Carpenter, auto racer, fifth place 2008 Indianapolis 500, pole sitter 2013, 2014
John Alden Carpenter, composer
Philo Carpenter, pharmacist
John Carpino, president of MLB's Los Angeles Angels
Allan Carr, producer, Grease, Saturday Night Fever
Charmian Carr, actress, The Sound of Music
Darleen Carr, actress, The Smith Family, The Beguiled
Chico Carrasquel, shortstop for White Sox, first Latin starter in All-Star Game (born in Venezuela)
Mark Carreon, MLB player 1987–96
Janet Carroll, actress, Risky Business, Family Business
Lucille Carroll, Hollywood studio executive
Jenny Lou Carson, sharpshooter, country music singer, in Nashville Songwriters Hall of Fame
Terrence C. Carson, actor, voice actor, Living Single, Star Wars: Clone Wars
Johnny Carter, singer, The Flamingos
Myra Carter, stage actress
Maurice Carthon, NFL running back and coach
James Cartwright, USMC general, Vice Chairman of the Joint Chiefs of Staff
Peter Cartwright, revivalist (born in Virginia)
William Frank Carver, Wild West sharpshooter and showman
Marty Casey, musician
Robert J. Casey, decorated soldier and correspondent
Zadok Casey, founder of Mount Vernon, Illinois, lieutenant governor, U.S. Representative (born in Georgia)
Vera Caspary, author, Laura
Bill Cassidy, U.S. Senator of Louisiana
Claudia Cassidy, music and drama critic
Dan Castellaneta, actor, The Simpsons, The Pursuit of Happyness, Happy Feet
John Castino, MLB infielder 1979–84, 1979 A.L. Rookie of the Year
Anthony Castonzo, offensive lineman for Indianapolis Colts
Frank Catalano, saxophonist
Wayne Catalano, horse racing trainer
George Catavolos, football coach
Tamika Catchings, basketball player, winner of NCAA, WNBA and Olympic championships
Mark Catlin Sr., football coach for Iowa 1906–08
Phil Cavarretta, player and manager for Chicago Cubs, 1945 National League MVP

Ce–Ch

Anton Cermak, politician (Democrat), assassinated Mayor of Chicago 1931–33 (born in Eastern Europe)
Eugene Cernan, astronaut, commander of Apollo 17
Jackie Cerone, mobster
Peter Cetera, singer and songwriter, "Glory of Love"
Tom T. Chamales, novelist
Wes Chamberlain, MLB outfielder 1990–95
John Chambers, Oscar-winning makeup artist
Gower Champion, multiple Tony Award-winning dancer, choreographer and actor, Show Boat, Carnival, Hello, Dolly!
Chance the Rapper, hip-hop artist
Frank Chance, Hall of Fame first baseman for Cubs (born in California)
John Chancellor, television journalist, NBC news anchor
Bill Chandler, basketball coach for Marquette 1930–51
Gene Chandler, singer, "The Duke of Earl"
George Chandler, actor
Kyle Chandler, Emmy-winning actor, Friday Night Lights, Argo, Carol, The Wolf of Wall Street
Raymond Chandler, author and screenwriter, The Big Sleep, Double Indemnity, The Long Goodbye, Farewell, My Lovely
Melanie Chandra, actress, Code Black
Jay Chandrasekhar, actor, comedian, film director
Octave Chanute, aviation pioneer
John Putnam Chapin, Mayor of Chicago 1846–47 (born in Vermont)
Brenda Chapman, animator and film director, The Prince of Egypt, Brave
Charles Chapman, mayor of Fullerton, California, founder of Chapman College
Pleasant T. Chapman, educator, lawyer, U.S. Representative
Ray Chapman, infielder for Cleveland Indians 1912–20 (born in Kentucky)
Joe Charboneau, outfielder with Cleveland Indians 1980–82
Ezzard Charles, boxing champion (born in Georgia)
Nick Charles, broadcaster for CNN
Hobart Chatfield-Taylor, author
Wayne Chatfield-Taylor, commerce and treasury secretary to FDR
Cheap Trick, rock band
Maurice Cheeks, NBA point guard, assistant coach for the Oklahoma City Thunder
Chris Chelios, Hall of Fame hockey player for Detroit Red Wings and Chicago Blackhawks
Steve Chen, co-creator of YouTube (born in Taiwan)
Virginia Cherrill, actress, City Lights, wife of Cary Grant
Leonard Chess, music executive, founder of Chess Records (born in Poland)
Lisa Chesson, Olympic hockey player
Augustus Louis Chetlain, Civil War general (born in Missouri)
Elizabeth Pickett Chevalier, tobacco heiress, silent-film director and writer
Chicago, musical group, 23 gold albums
Judy Chicago, feminist artist and author
Gery Chico, lawyer, politician, chairman of Illinois State Board of Education
Brad Childress, head coach of Minnesota Vikings 2006–10
The Chi-Lites, R & B group
Carl R. Chindblom, Cook County attorney, U.S. Representative 1919–33
Bob Chinn, restaurateur (born in Minnesota)
Burnett M. Chiperfield, veteran of Spanish–American War, U.S. Representative
Robert B. Chiperfield, veteran of World War I, U.S. Representative
Harry Chiti, catcher for four MLB teams
Whitney Chitwood, stand-up comedian
Kim Chizevsky-Nicholls, IFBB pro bodybuilder
Anna Chlumsky, actress, My Girl, Veep
Clyde L. Choate, politician, World War II Medal of Honor recipient
Greta Christina, atheist blogger, speaker, and author
William Christopher, actor, M*A*S*H
June Christy, big-band singer
Amy Chua, professor at Yale Law School, author of World on Fire
Kenneth Choi, actor, Sons of Anarchy, The Wolf of Wall Street
Marguerite S. Church, psychologist, 6-term U.S. Representative, widow of Ralph Church
Ralph E. Church, lawyer, U.S. Representative 1935–49

Ci–Cn

Tony Cingrani, pitcher for St. Louis Cardinals
Gertrude Claire, silent-film actress
Bud Clancy, MLB first baseman 1924–34
Jim Clancy, pitcher for Toronto Blue Jays and Houston Astros
Bridgetta Clark, silent-film actress
Colbert Clark, screenwriter and director
Danny Clark, linebacker for five NFL teams
Dee Clark, singer, "Raindrops"
George Clark, football coach, Kansas State, Nebraska
Mark Clark, pitcher for five MLB teams
Mark W. Clark, World War II general (born in South Carolina)
Randy Clark, NFL lineman 1980–87
Wesley Clark, retired U.S. Army general, Presidential Medal of Freedom recipient, 2004 presidential candidate
Wilbur Clark, original owner of Desert Inn hotel in Las Vegas
Otis Clay, musician in Blues Hall of Fame
Ethel Clayton, early 20th-century actress
James Cleveland, Grammy-winning gospel singer
Nathaniel Clifton, player for New York Knicks, Harlem Globetrotters
Hillary Clinton, attorney and politician, former First Lady (1993–2000), U.S. Senator of New York (2000–2009) and U.S. Secretary of State; 2016 Democratic presidential nominee
William H. Clothier, Oscar-nominated cinematographer

Coa–Com

Ed Coady, quarterback of first Notre Dame victory, 1888
Pat Coady, Notre Dame quarterback, 1892
Henry Ives Cobb Jr., artist and architect
Junie Cobb, musician and bandleader (born in Arkansas)
Silas B. Cobb, industrialist (born in Vermont)
Ali Cobrin, actress, American Reunion, Lap Dance
Catherine Amanda Coburn, journalist, editor 
Diablo Cody, Oscar-winning screenwriter, Juno
Eleanor Coen, artist
Ryan Cohan, jazz pianist
Aaron Cohen (born 1981), judoka 
 Irwin Cohen (1952–2012), Olympic judoka
Paul Cohen, music producer
Steve Cohen (born 1955), Olympic judoka
David Cohn (born 1995), American-Israeli basketball player 
Sonny Cohn, trumpeter
Mark Cohon, commissioner of Canadian Football League
Bryan Colangelo, NBA executive
Jerry Colangelo, chairman of USA Basketball, owned Arizona Diamondbacks and Phoenix Suns
Stephen Colbert, comedian, alumnus of Northwestern and Second City (born in Washington, D.C.)
Freddy Cole, jazz musician, brother of Nat King Cole
Gary Cole, actor, The Brady Bunch Movie, Office Space, Midnight Caller, Fatal Vision, Family Guy
Ike Cole, jazz musician, brother of Nat King Cole
James M. Cole, U.S. Deputy Attorney General under President Barack Obama
Nat King Cole, singer, musician and actor, Grammy Lifetime Achievement Award (born in Alabama)
Robert MacFarlan Cole III, chemical engineer, inventor, and author
Bessie Coleman, aviator
Ellis Coleman, Greco-Roman wrestler
Gary Coleman, actor, Arnold Jackson on Diff'rent Strokes
John Coleman, TV weather forecaster (born in Texas)
Tevin Coleman, running back for Atlanta Falcons
Edward Coles, secretary to James Madison, second Governor of Illinois (born in Virginia)
Michael Colgrass, winner of 1978 Pulitzer Prize for music
Ned Colletti, general manager for Los Angeles Dodgers 2006–14
Harold R. Collier, mayor of Berwyn, 18-year U.S. Representative
Lou Collier, MLB player 1997–2004
Bob Collins, radio personality (born in Florida)
Cardiss Collins, politician (Democrat), U.S. Representative 1973–97 (born in Missouri)
Chris Collins, basketball head coach for Northwestern
Doug Collins, NBA and Olympic basketball player, head coach of Philadelphia 76ers, Detroit Pistons, Washington Wizards and Chicago Bulls, TV commentator
Eddie Collins, Hall of Fame infielder, manager for White Sox (born in New York)
George W. Collins, U.S. Representative 1970–72
Julia Collins, 20-time winner on TV's Jeopardy!
Kreigh Collins, tennis player, 1899 US Open semi-finalist
Marva Collins, educator (born in Alabama)
Phil Collins, pitcher for three MLB teams
Sherron Collins, NBA point guard
James Colosimo, organized crime figure
George Radcliffe Colton, U.S. Representative from Nebraska, governor of Puerto Rico
Harvey Doolittle Colvin, city treasurer, Mayor of Chicago 1873–75 (born in New York)
Ruth Johnson Colvin, literacy activist, Presidential Medal of Freedom
Shawn Colvin, singer and songwriter
Harry Combes, 20-year head basketball coach at Illinois
Charles Comiskey, founding owner of Chicago White Sox, member of baseball Hall of Fame
Chuck Comiskey, owner of White Sox 1956–61
Grace Comiskey, owner of White Sox 1939–56
J. Louis Comiskey, owner of White Sox 1931–39
Common, rap musician, songwriter, producer, actor
Ann Compton, television journalist

Con–Coz

Douglas Conant, CEO of the Campbell Soup Company
Edwin H. Conger, ambassador, congressman, Civil War officer
Jocko Conlan, Hall of Fame baseball umpire
Darlene Conley, actress, The Bold and the Beautiful
Mike Conley Sr., athlete, gold medalist, triple jump, 1992 Barcelona Olympics
Bart Conner, gymnast, gold medalist, parallel bars, 1984 Los Angeles Olympics
Mike Connolly, gossip columnist
George Connor, Hall of Fame offensive tackle and linebacker for Chicago Bears
Jimmy Connors, tennis player, 5-time US Open champion, twice Wimbledon champion, ranked No. 1 in world
Robert Conrad, actor, Hawaiian Eye, The Wild Wild West, Baa Baa Black Sheep, Palm Springs Weekend
Bill Conroy, MLB catcher 1935–44
Sean Considine, safety for five NFL teams
Hollis Conway, high jumper, two-time Olympic medalist
Brian Cook, forward for Illinois and five NBA teams
Daniel Pope Cook, lawyer, publisher, state's first attorney general; Cook County named for him (born in Kentucky)
Elisha Cook Jr., character actor, The Maltese Falcon, Shane, The Killing, The Big Sleep, House on Haunted Hill
John Pope Cook, Civil War general, mayor of Springfield
Toi Cook, defensive back for San Francisco 49ers, New Orleans Saints
Sam Cooke, singer, "You Send Me", "Chain Gang", recipient of Grammy Lifetime Achievement Award (born in Mississippi)
William F. Coolbaugh, 19th-century banker (born in Pennsylvania)
Ron Coomer, infielder for Minnesota Twins, sportscaster
Sam Coonrod, major league pitcher
Cynthia Cooper, basketball player and coach, 4-time WNBA champion
D. J. Cooper (born 1990), basketball player in the Israeli Basketball Premier League
Jerome Cooper, drummer
Job Adams Cooper, Governor of Colorado 1889–91
Martin Cooper, inventor of modern cell phone
Maxine Cooper, actress, Kiss Me Deadly
Wyllis Cooper, radio writer, screenwriter
Ira C. Copley, publisher, U.S. Representative 1911–23
Ben Corbett, film actor
George Corbett, running back for Chicago Bears 1932–38
Virginia Lee Corbin, actress (born in Arizona)
Tom Corcoran, politician (Republican), 4-term U.S. Representative
Kevin Cordes, NCAA champion swimmer
Billy Corgan, musician for alternative rock band Smashing Pumpkins
Bartlett Cormack, playwright and screenwriter
Jim Cornelison, tenor, anthem singer
Don Cornelius, television host, producer, creator of Soul Train
Lillian Cornell, singer and actress
Frank Cornish, NFL lineman 1990–95
Frank J. Corr, alderman, acting Mayor of Chicago 1933
Charles Correll, co-creator and star of Amos 'n' Andy
Eldzier Cortor, artist (born in Virginia)
Joe Corvo, hockey player
Dave Corzine, center for DePaul and Chicago Bulls
Jon Corzine, CEO of Goldman Sachs, U.S. Senator of New Jersey 2001–06, Governor 2006–10
Pete Cosey, guitarist for Miles Davis
Jerry F. Costello, politician (Democrat), U.S. Representative 1988–2013
Neal Cotts, pitcher for 2005 World Series champion White Sox
John Coughlin, politician (Democrat), Chicago alderman 1893–1938
Johnny Coulon, boxer, bantamweight champion 1910–14 (born in Canada)
Jim Courtright, Wild West gunfighter, lawman
Kirk Cousins, quarterback for the Minnesota Vikings
Bryan Cox, linebacker for Miami Dolphins and Super Bowl XXXVI champion New England Patriots
Jim Cox, MLB player 1973–76
Sonny Cox, musician, coach (born in Ohio)
Wally Cox, actor, Mister Peepers, Underdog (born in Michigan)
Dale Coyne, auto racing driver and executive
Kendall Coyne, hockey player, silver medalist at 2014 Winter Olympics
Chief Keef (Keith Cozart), rapper, singer, songwriter and record producer
James Gould Cozzens, novelist, By Love Possessed

Cr–Cz

Wallace Craig, experimental psychologist, behavior scientist (born in Canada)
Yvonne Craig, actress, Batman, Kissin' Cousins
Dan Crane, dentist, politician (Republican), U.S. Representative
Phil Crane, politician (Republican), U.S. Representative 1969–2005
Cindy Crawford, supermodel, cosmetics entrepreneur, actress and TV personality, House of Style
Danny Crawford, NBA referee
Ellen Crawford, actress, ER
Jim Crawford, MLB pitcher 1973–78
Oliver Crawford, blacklisted screenwriter
Dewitt Clinton Cregier, engineer, mason, Mayor of Chicago 1889–91 (born in New York)
John Crerar, industrialist, railroad director (born in New York)
Jim Crews, basketball head coach for St. Louis University
Michael Crichton, author, screenwriter, director, Jurassic Park, ER, Westworld, Rising Sun, Coma, Disclosure
Fritz Crisler, football head coach for Michigan, Minnesota, Princeton
John P. Cromwell, submarine commander
James Cronin, physicist, 1980 Nobel Prize recipient
Kevin Cronin, lead vocalist for REO Speedwagon
Shawn Cronin, NHL defenseman 1988–95
Casey Crosby, pitcher for Detroit Tigers 2012
Jim Crowley, NFL player, coach, College Football Hall of Fame
Henry Crown, businessman, philanthropist
Lester Crown, businessman, philanthropist
Arthur Crudup, musician, "That's All Right" (born in Mississippi)
Dave Cruikshank, speed skater, four-time Olympian
The Cryan' Shames, rock band
Bob Cryder, NFL guard 1978–86
Walt Cudzik, NFL center 1954–64
Melinda Culea, actress, Brotherly Love, Knots Landing, The A-Team
John Cullerton, politician
William J. Cullerton, decorated World War II pilot
Shelby Moore Cullom, lawyer, Governor of Illinois 1877–1883, U.S. Senator 1883–1913 (born in Kentucky)
Edith Cummings, golfer, 1923 U.S. Women's Amateur champion
Terry Cummings, player for DePaul and seven NBA teams
Lester Cuneo, silent-film actor
Barbara Flynn Currie, politician (Democrat), state representative since 1979
Betty Currie, personal secretary to President Bill Clinton
Adrianne Curry, model and America's Next Top Model winner
Eddy Curry, center for four NBA teams
Alan Curtis, actor, High Sierra, Buck Privates
Charlotte Curtis, journalist, New York Times
James Curtiss, Mayor of Chicago 1847–51 (born in Connecticut)
Mary Curzon, baroness
Ann Cusack, actress, The Jeff Foxworthy Show, Maggie
Joan Cusack, actress, Working Girl, In & Out, Broadcast News, School of Rock, Toy Story 2, Shameless
John Cusack, actor, Eight Men Out, Con Air, High Fidelity, The Grifters, Grosse Pointe Blank, 1408, 2012
Matt Cushing, NFL tight end 1999–2004
Clive Cussler, novelist of multiple best-sellers, Raise the Titanic!, Sahara, creator of Dirk Pitt
Ethan Cutkosky, actor, Shameless
Slade Cutter, decorated World War II submarine officer
Mike Cvengros, MLB pitcher 1922–29
Ziggy Czarobski, Hall of Fame tackle for Notre Dame

D
Da–Dd

Bob Dahl, NFL lineman 1991–97
Bill Daily, actor, I Dream of Jeannie, The Bob Newhart Show (born in Iowa)
John Francis Daley, actor, Bones, Freaks and Geeks
Richard J. Daley, politician (Democrat), member of the Illinois State Assembly, Mayor of Chicago 1955–1976
Richard M. Daley, politician (Democrat), attorney, Illinois state senator, Mayor of Chicago 1989–2011, son of Richard J. Daley
William M. Daley, U.S. Secretary of Commerce and White House Chief of Staff
Rick Dalpos, pro golfer
Dorothy Dalton, silent-film actress
Joel Daly, television journalist
Lar Daly, perennial politician
Mark Damon, actor
Anthony D'Andrea, organized crime figure (born in Sicily)
Ben Daniels, lawman, one of Teddy Roosevelt's Rough Riders
Bert Daniels, MLB outfielder 1910–14
Owen Daniels, NFL tight end
Randy Daniels, politician (Republican), Secretary of State of New York, Deputy Mayor of New York City
Shirley Danz, pro baseball player
Eleanor Dapkus, pro baseball player
Scott Darling, NHL goaltender
Erik Darnell, NASCAR driver for Roush Fenway Racing
Lisa Darr, actress, Popular, Life As We Know It, Flesh 'n' Blood
Frankie Darro, actor
Clarence Darrow, renowned Chicago-based attorney, Leopold and Loeb case, Scopes Trial (born in Ohio)
Justin Whitlock Dart Sr., executive of Walgreens, Rexall
Tom Dart, sheriff of Cook County
Kristin Dattilo, actress, The Chris Isaak Show, Hitz
Brian Daubach, MLB outfielder, minor-league manager
Doris Davenport, actress, The Westerner
George Davenport, frontiersman, Rock Island settler, Davenport, Iowa named for him (born in England)
Bob Davidson, baseball umpire
Andrew Davis, film director, The Fugitive, Under Siege, A Perfect Murder, The Guardian
Anthony Davis, basketball player for New Orleans Pelicans
Carl Davis, boxing cruiserweight champion, 2010
Carl Davis, music producer
Clifton Davis, actor and songwriter, "Never Can Say Goodbye"
Danny K. Davis, politician (Democrat), U.S. Representative
David Davis, campaign manager of Abe Lincoln, U.S. Senator, Supreme Court justice (born in Maryland)
Dorothy Salisbury Davis, crime novelist
Edith Luckett Davis, mother of Nancy Reagan (born in Virginia)
Floyd Davis, co-winner of 1941 Indianapolis 500
George Davis, magazine editor
George R. Davis, Civil War captain, U.S. Representative (born in Massachusetts)
Jessie Bartlett Davis, opera contralto
Miles Davis, jazz musician, bandleader and composer, Grammy Lifetime Achievement Award
Orbert Davis, trumpeter
Rece Davis, television sportscaster
Richard Davis, jazz musician
Scott Davis, defensive end for Los Angeles Raiders 1988–94
Shani Davis, two-time Olympic and world champion speed skater
Zachary Taylor Davis, architect, Comiskey Park, Archbishop Quigley Preparatory Seminary
Clinton Davisson, Nobel Prize-winning physicist who discovered electron diffraction
Charles G. Dawes, Vice President of United States 1925–29, winner of Nobel Peace Prize (born in Ohio)
Jimmy Dawkins, blues musician (born in Mississippi)
Johnny Dawson, golfer, course designer
William L. Dawson, politician (Democrat), U.S. Representative 1943–70 (born in Georgia)
J. Edward Day, lawyer and United States Postmaster General 1961–63
Todd Day, basketball player, all-time scoring leader for Arkansas

De–Dh

 

Margia Dean, actress and Miss America 1939 runner-up
William F. Dean, World War II and Korean War general
Jeffery Deaver, mystery novelist
Billy DeBeck, cartoonist, creator of Barney Google
Eugene V. Debs, socialist, IWW union leader, presidential candidate (born in Indiana)
H. Joel Deckard, U.S. Representative for Indiana 1979–83
Steve Decker, MLB catcher 1990–99
Bill DeCorrevont, Northwestern and pro football player
Karen DeCrow, president of National Organization for Women
Frances Dee, actress, Wells Fargo, Four Faces West (born in California)
Lola Dee, singer
Merri Dee, television personality
John Deere, founder of Deere & Company (born in Vermont)
Archie Dees, two-time Big Ten basketball MVP (born in Mississippi)
Dudley DeGroot, coach of Washington Redskins and college teams
Jack DeJohnette, jazz drummer
Paul DeJong, MLB player (born in Florida)
Lois Delander, first Miss America from Illinois (1927)
Frederic Delano, railroad president, uncle of FDR (born in New York)
Lea DeLaria, actress
Vaughn De Leath, singer
Floyd Dell, novelist and playwright
The Dells, singing group, Rock and Roll Hall of Fame
Al Demaree, MLB pitcher 1912–19
AnnMaria De Mars, technology executive, author, world champion judoka; mother of Ronda Rousey
Bruce DeMars, four-star U.S. Navy admiral
William Dembski, mathematician, philosopher and theologian
Ray Demmitt, MLB outfielder 1909–19
Charles S. Deneen, two-term Governor of Illinois
Edward E. Denison, politician, U.S. Representative 1915–31
Elias Smith Dennis, politician, Civil War general (born in New York)
Richard Dent, Hall of Fame defensive lineman for Chicago Bears, MVP of Super Bowl XX (born in Georgia)
Thomas Dent, 19th-century attorney
Justin Dentmon, professional basketball player, 2010 top scorer in the Israel Basketball Premier League
Oscar Stanton De Priest, U.S. Representative, civil rights advocate, first African American elected to Congress in 20th century (born in Alabama)
Bruce Dern, Oscar-nominated actor, Black Sunday, The Great Gatsby, Silent Running, Family Plot, Coming Home, Nebraska
Ed Derwinski, politician, U.S. Representative 1959–83 and U.S. Secretary of Veteran Affairs 1989–92
Tony DeSantis, theatre owner, Drury Lane
Jackie DeShannon, singer, "What the World Needs Now Is Love"
Paul Des Jardien, University of Chicago center, College Football Hall of Fame, MLB pitcher (born in Kansas)
Sam DeStefano, mobster
Armand Deutsch, film producer
William Emmett Dever, Mayor of Chicago 1923–27 (born in Massachusetts)
Karla DeVito, singer and actress
Laura Devon, actress, Red Line 7000, Goodbye Charlie
Peter De Vries, author, Pete 'n' Tillie, Reuben, Reuben
James Dewar, baker, creator of Hostess Twinkie
John Dewey, philosopher (born in Vermont)
Lee DeWyze, singer, American Idol Season 9 winner
Susan Dey, actress, The Partridge Family, L.A. Law
Dennis DeYoung, musician for rock band Styx

Di–Dn

David Díaz, lightweight boxing champion 2007–08
Victor Diaz, baseball player (born in Dominican Republic)
Andy Dick, comedian, NewsRadio (born in South Carolina)
Philip K. Dick, science-fiction author, stories became films Blade Runner, Minority Report, Total Recall
Augustus Dickens, brother of Charles Dickens (born in England)
Basil Dickey, screenwriter
Frances Dickinson, physician, clubwoman, writer
Johnny Dickshot, MLB outfielder 1936–45
Bo Diddley, rock and blues musician, composer, Rock and Roll Hall of Fame (born in Mississippi)
Nelson Diebel, swimmer, 1992 Olympic gold medalist
David Diehl, offensive tackle, two-time Super Bowl champion with New York Giants 2003–13
Pony Diehl, Wild West outlaw
Doug Dieken, offensive lineman for Cleveland Browns 1971–84
Ryan Diem, offensive tackle for Super Bowl XLI champion Indianapolis Colts 2001–11
Scott Dierking, running back for New York Jets 1977–83
William H. Dieterich, U.S. Senator of Illinois 1933–39
Charles Henry Dietrich, U.S. Senator and Governor of Nebraska
Vince DiFrancesca, football coach, Western Illinois, Iowa State
Tracy Dildy, basketball coach for Chicago State
John Dillinger, notorious bank robber, lived and died in Chicago, subject of films Dillinger, Public Enemies (born in Indiana)
Frank Dillon, baseball player
Melinda Dillon, Oscar-nominated actress, A Christmas Story, Absence of Malice, Close Encounters of the Third Kind
Paul Dinello, actor, comedian, The Colbert Report
Gerald Di Pego, screenwriter
Everett Dirksen, politician (Republican), United States Senator 1951–69, Senate Minority Leader
Louis Disbrow, auto racer, drove in first four Indianapolis 500s
Roy O. Disney, co-founder of Walt Disney Productions
Walt Disney, iconic film and TV director, producer and animator, Disney studio founder and creator of Disneyland
Mike Ditka, Hall of Fame pro football player and coach, TV commentator, restaurateur (born in Pennsylvania)
Michael Diversey, brewer, 19th-century alderman (born in Germany)
Alan J. Dixon, state treasurer, U.S. Senator 1981–93
Jessy Dixon, gospel singer
Leo Dixon, MLB catcher 1925–29
Malik Dixon, American basketball player, top scorer in the 2005 Israel Basketball Premier League
Sherwood Dixon, lieutenant governor under Adlai Stevenson II
Willie Dixon, blues musician (born in Mississippi)

Do–Dt

Conrad Dobler, NFL offensive lineman 1972–81
Larry Doby, baseball pioneer, outfielder, manager for Chicago White Sox (born in South Carolina)
Townsend F. Dodd, World War I pilot, Distinguished Service Medal
Katherine Sturges Dodge, illustrator
Dorothy L. Dodson, U.S. champion in javelin and shot put
Eddie Doherty, journalist, Oscar-nominated screenwriter
Edward A. Doisy, biochemist, 1943 Nobel Prize
Dave Dombrowski, President of Baseball Operations of Boston Red Sox
Jim Donahue, 19th-century baseball player
John Donahoe, CEO of eBay, chairman of PayPal
Mark Donahue, lineman for Michigan and Cincinnati Bengals
Dorothy Donegan, jazz pianist
Mike Donlin, baseball player and actor
George Donner, organizer of Donner Party (born in North Carolina)
Ral Donner, singer
Professor Mike Donovan, middleweight boxer of bare-knuckle era
Jimmy Dore, stand-up comedian, political commentator
Tom Dore, basketball player and broadcaster
Dolores Dorn, actress, The Bounty Hunter, Underworld U.S.A.
Thomas A. Dorsey, gospel musician
John Dos Passos, novelist
Emily Taft Douglas, politician, U.S. Representative, first female Democrat from state elected to Congress
Mike Douglas, singer and television talk-show host
Paul Douglas, professor, politician (Democrat), 18-year U.S. Senator of Illinois (born in Massachusetts)
Stephen A. Douglas, politician (Democrat), U.S. Senator 1847–61, presidential candidate vs. Abe Lincoln (born in Vermont)
John A. Dowie, faith healer, Zion, Illinois founder (born in Scotland)
Dave Downey, basketball player, holder of University of Illinois single-game scoring record
Mike Downey, Los Angeles and Chicago newspaper columnist
Susan Downey, film producer, Sherlock Holmes, Iron Man 2, The Judge, wife of Robert Downey Jr.
Wayne A. Downing, four-star U.S. Army general
Larry Doyle, infielder, New York Giants, 1912 National League MVP
Larry Doyle, writer, I Love You, Beth Cooper, The Simpsons
Betsy Drake, actress, wife of Cary Grant (born in France)
Francis M. Drake, Civil War general, Governor of Iowa
Frank Drake, astronomer, astrophysicist
John Drake, co-founder of the Drake Hotel
Johnny Drake, NFL running back 1937–41
Tracy Drake, co-founder of the Drake Hotel
Yochi Dreazen, journalist
Jack Drees, television sportscaster
Lance Dreher, 1986 Mr. Universe
Theodore Dreiser, author, social activist (born in Indiana)
Chuck Dressen, football quarterback, baseball manager for Brooklyn Dodgers and four more MLB teams
Paddy Driscoll, Hall of Fame quarterback and head coach for the Chicago Cardinals and Chicago Bears
Robert Drivas, actor, The Illustrated Man, Cool Hand Luke
Vincent Drucci, mobster
John Drury, television journalist
Charles Dryden, early 20th-century sportswriter

Du–Dz

Fred Dubois, 2-term U.S. Senator from Idaho
Richard L. Duchossois, horse racing executive
Kevin Duckworth, center for five NBA teams
Tammy Duckworth, veteran of Iraq War, U.S. Representative and U.S. Senator (born in Thailand)
Art Dufelmeier, played for 1947 Rose Bowl champion Illinois, coached Western Illinois 1960–68
John Duff, counterfeiter, Revolutionary War scout
Dennis Dugan, director, actor, Big Daddy, Beverly Hills Ninja, Happy Gilmore, Jack and Jill, Grown Ups
Tom Duggan, television commentator
Tony Dumas, NBA player 1994–98
Arne Duncan, U.S. Secretary of Education 2009–15
Joseph Duncan, Governor of Illinois 1834–38, 4-term U.S. Representative (born in Kentucky)
Michael Clarke Duncan, actor, The Green Mile, Kung Fu Panda, Armageddon, Planet of the Apes
Thomas Duncan, Civil War general
Katherine Dunham, dancer and choreographer
Russell E. Dunham, decorated World War II soldier
Robert Hugo Dunlap, officer at Iwo Jima, winner of Medal of Honor
Kevin Dunn, actor, Transformers, Nixon, Unstoppable, Veep
Nora Dunn, actress, comedian, Saturday Night Live, Sisters, Bruce Almighty, Three Kings
Edward Joseph Dunne, bishop of Dallas 1894–1910 (born in Ireland)
Finley Peter Dunne, author and journalist
Edward Fitzsimmons Dunne, Mayor of Chicago 1905–07 and Governor of Illinois 1913–17 (born in Connecticut)
George Dunne, president of Cook County Commissioners 1969–91
Murphy Dunne, actor, keyboard player for Blues Brothers
Santiago Durango, musician, attorney (born in Colombia)
Chad Durbin, pitcher for eight MLB teams
Dick Durbin, politician (Democrat), senior U.S. Senator of Illinois, Majority Whip, U.S. Representative
Jim Durkin, politician (Republican), state representative
Lindsey Durlacher, Greco-Roman wrestler, bronze medalist at World Championships
Charles Duryea, automotive pioneer
Jean Baptiste Point du Sable, settler, founder of Chicago
Erv Dusak, player for 1946 World Series champion St. Louis Cardinals
Charles Dvorak, pole vaulter, 1904 Olympic gold medalist
Jim Dwyer, outfielder for seven MLB teams
Conor Dwyer, swimmer, gold medalist at 2012 London Olympics
Thomas Dyer, president of Chicago Board of Trade, Mayor of Chicago 1856–57 (born in Connecticut)
Walter Dyett, musician and educator
Jimmy Dykes, player and manager for White Sox (born in Pennsylvania)

E
Ea–Em

Amelia Earhart, pioneer aviator, Chicago Hyde Park High graduate (born in Kansas)
Mary Tracy Earle, writer
Jug Earp, pro football player
Wyatt Earp, iconic American West lawman, subject of Tombstone, My Darling Clementine, Gunfight at the O.K. Corral
Earth, Wind & Fire, band in Rock and Roll Hall of Fame
John Porter East, U.S. Senator for North Carolina 1981–86
Martin Eberhard, co-founder of Tesla Motors
Christine Ebersole, 2-time Tony Award-winning actress and singer, Saturday Night Live, Ryan's Hope, 42nd Street
Roger Ebert, film critic, Pulitzer Prize-winning journalist, author, television personality, co-host of Siskel & Ebert
Buddy Ebsen, actor, The Beverly Hillbillies, Barnaby Jones, Captain January, Davy Crockett, Breakfast at Tiffany's
Vilma Ebsen, dancer and actress, Broadway Melody of 1936
Earl Eby, athlete, silver medalist in 1920 Summer Olympics
Garrett Eckbo, landscape architect
Walter Eckersall, fullback for Chicago 1905 national champions, Hall of Fame, sportswriter, referee
William Eckert, Major League Baseball commissioner 1965–68
James Eckhouse, actor, Beverly Hills, 90210
Nora Eddington, actress, wife of Errol Flynn
Dwight Eddleman, three-sport Illinois athlete, NBA All-Star
J. W. Eddy, politician, lawyer, Angels Flight designer (born in New York)
John R. Eden, 19th-century U.S. Representative (born in Kentucky)
Jim Edgar, secretary of state and 1991–99 Governor of Illinois
John Edgar, naval commander, land baron, politician (born in Ireland)
Robert W. Edgren, cartoonist, 1904 Olympic athlete
Benjamin S. Edwards, 19th-century lawyer and politician
Bruce Edwards, MLB catcher 1946–56
India Edwards, vice-chair of Democratic National Committee 1950–56
Jon Edwards, pitcher for San Diego Padres
Ninian Edwards, politician (Democratic-Republican), U.S. Senator 1818–26 and Governor of Illinois 1826–30 (born in Maryland)
Ninian Wirt Edwards, educator, married to sister of Mary Todd Lincoln
Steve Edwards, pro football lineman
Chandler Egan, NCAA, U.S. Amateur golf champion, course designer
Edward Egan, cardinal, archbishop of New York 2000–2009
John Joseph Egan, monsignor, civil rights activist
Walter Egan, golfer, 1904 Olympic gold medalist
Dave Eggers, writer, editor, and publisher, author of A Heartbreaking Work of Staggering Genius
Rube Ehrhardt, MLB pitcher 1924–29
David Eigenberg, actor, Steve Brady on Sex and the City
Deborah Eisenberg, short story writer, actress
Brett Eldredge, country singer
Charlie Elgar, bandleader (born in Louisiana)
Karl Eller, owner of the Phoenix Suns
Kurt Elling, jazz singer
Bump Elliott, halfback for Michigan and Purdue, coach at Michigan, athletic director at Iowa, College Football Hall of Fame
Ezekiel Elliott, running back for the Dallas Cowboys
Jake Elliott, placekicker for the Philadelphia Eagles
Pete Elliott, football head coach for Nebraska, Illinois, Cal and Miami, College Football Hall of Fame
Bo Ellis, basketball player for 1977 NCAA champion Marquette and Denver Nuggets
Fred Ellis, cartoonist
LaPhonso Ellis, center for four NBA teams
Nelsan Ellis, actor, True Blood, Get On Up
Larry Ellison, co-founder and CEO of Oracle Corporation
Elmer E. Ellsworth, first Civil War casualty (born in New York)
Bob Elson, Hall of Fame baseball broadcaster
John Ely, pitcher for Los Angeles Dodgers 2010–12
Melvin Ely, center-forward for five NBA teams
Ari Emanuel, Hollywood superagent, co-CEO of William Morris Endeavor
Rahm Emanuel, Mayor of Chicago, U.S. Representative 2003–09, senior advisor to Bill Clinton 1993–98, Chief of Staff to Barack Obama 2009–10
Louis Lincoln Emmerson, merchant, secretary of state and Governor of Illinois 1929–33

En–Ez

Eric Engberg, television journalist
Larry English, linebacker for Tampa Bay Buccaneers
Jason Enloe, pro golfer
Rex Enright, football coach, South Carolina 1938–56
William Enyart, politician (Democrat), U.S. Representative 2013–15
A. J. Epenesa, defensive lineman for Iowa Hawkeyes
Philip "Phil" Erenberg (1909–1992), gymnast and Olympic silver medalist
Paul Erickson, pitcher for Cubs 1941–48
Roger Erickson, MLB pitcher 1978–83
John Erlander, furniture manufacturer (born in Sweden)
John N. Erlenborn, politician (Republican), U.S. Representative 1965–85
Cameron Esposito, comedian
Joe Esposito, road manager of Elvis Presley, Michael Jackson
Joe Esposito, organized crime figure (born in Italy)
Sammy Esposito, infielder for White Sox 1952–63
Tony Esposito, 15-year goaltender for Chicago Blackhawks, member of Hockey Hall of Fame (born in Canada)
Bill Essick, MLB pitcher and scout
Richard Estes, photorealistic painter
Nick Etten, MLB first baseman 1938–47
Ruth Etting, singer, subject of Love Me or Leave Me (born in Nebraska)
Aja Evans, bobsledder, bronze medalist at 2014 Winter Olympics
Andrea Evans, actress, One Life to Live
Bergen Evans, television personality, professor (born in Ohio)
Bill Evans, jazz musician
Billy Evans, MLB umpire
Chick Evans, golfer, won U.S. Open as amateur, member of World Golf Hall of Fame
Dan Evans, baseball executive
Fred Evans, NFL defensive tackle 2006–13
John Evans, physician, governor of Colorado territory, co-founder of Northwestern University (born in Ohio)
Lane Evans, politician (Democrat), U.S. Representative 1983–2007
Marsha J. Evans, admiral, CEO of American Red Cross
Betty Everett, singer (born in Mississippi)
Elizabeth Hawley Everett, educator, writer
Phil Everly, singer with Everly Brothers, Rock and Roll Hall of Fame
Hoot Evers, MLB outfielder 1941–56 (born in Missouri)
Johnny Evers, Hall of Fame second baseman, managed Cubs and White Sox (born in New York)
Cory Everson, 6-time Ms. Olympia (born in Wisconsin)
Jimmy Evert, tennis player and coach, father of Chris Evert
Fred Ewing, surgeon, Oklahoma football coach
Thomas W. Ewing, politician (Republican), U.S. Representative 1991–2001
William Lee D. Ewing, governor (14 days) and U.S. Senator 1835–37 (born in Kentucky)

F
Fa–Fh

Red Faber, Hall of Fame pitcher for White Sox; three wins in 1917 World Series (born in Iowa)
Janet Fairbank, opera singer
N.K. Fairbank, soap manufacturer, philanthropist
Don Fairfield, pro golfer (born in Kansas)
Ben Falcone, actor, director, Tammy, Bridesmaids
Cy Falkenberg, MLB pitcher 1903–17
Richard Fancy, actor, General Hospital, The District, Seinfeld
Jim Fanning, MLB player, manager and general manager
Kay Fanning, newspaper editor and publisher
Dennis Farina, actor, Chicago police officer, Law & Order, Crime Story, Get Shorty, Manhunter, Saving Private Ryan
Chris Farley, comedian and actor, Second City and Saturday Night Live (born in Wisconsin)
Dot Farley, silent-film actress
Ed Farmer, pitcher for eight MLB teams, sportscaster
Mimsy Farmer, actress, Spencer's Mountain, Hot Rods to Hell
Henry Farnam, surveyor, builder and president of Chicago, Rock Island and Pacific Railroad (born in New York)
Elon J. Farnsworth, Union general in Civil War, killed at Gettysburg
John F. Farnsworth, Union general in Civil War, 7-term U.S. Representative (born in Canada)
Louis Farrakhan, Nation of Islam leader
James T. Farrell, author, Studs Lonigan
Charles B. Farwell, philanthropist, U.S. Senator (born in New York)
John V. Farwell, department store founder (born in New York)
Sal Fasano, MLB catcher 1996–2008
Jeff Fassero, pitcher for nine MLB teams
Nancy Faust, musician, stadium organist
Harris W. Fawell, politician (Republican), U.S. Representative 1985–99
Meagen Fay, actress, Second City, Dirty Rotten Scoundrels, Malcolm in the Middle
Kenneth Fearing, poet and novelist
Carol Feeney, rower, Olympic silver medalist
Jesse W. Fell, land baron, helped establish Illinois State University (born in Pennsylvania)
Alfred T. Fellheimer, architect 
John Felske, MLB player and manager
Gary Fencik, defensive back for Super Bowl XX champion Chicago Bears
Jean Fenn, opera singer
Irene Fenwick, silent-film actress, wife of Lionel Barrymore
Tom Fergus, NHL center 1981–93
Helen Ferguson, film publicist and actress
Enrico Fermi, nuclear physicist, University of Chicago professor, 1936 Nobel Prize in Physics winner (born in Italy)
Joseph Ferriola, mobster
George Washington Gale Ferris Jr., inventor of Ferris wheel
Elisha P. Ferry, first Governor of Washington (born in Michigan)
Edwin Feulner, president of The Heritage Foundation 1977–2013
Tina Fey, actress and comedian, writer-performer for Second City (born in Pennsylvania)

Fi–Fn

 

Lupe Fiasco, rapper, musician
Carl Fick, filmmaker, novelist
Orlando B. Ficklin, U.S. Representative 1843–49 (born in Kentucky)
Eugene Field, journalist and author
Marshall Field, businessman, department store founder and philanthropist (born in Massachusetts)
Marshall Field III, banker, publisher and philanthropist
Marshall Field IV, owner of Chicago Sun-Times 1956–65
Ted Field, entrepreneur, auto racing, film producer, Cocktail, Runaway Bride, Mr. Holland's Opus, Riddick
Jackie Fields, boxer, Olympic and pro welterweight champ
Joseph W. Fifer, Civil War officer, city attorney of Bloomington, Governor of Illinois (born in Virginia)
Tim Finchem, commissioner of golf's PGA Tour
Paul Findley, politician (Republican), U.S. Representative 1961–83
Vivian Fine, composer
Jim Finigan, MLB infielder 1954–59
Tom Fink, mayor of Anchorage, Alaska 1987–94
Charles O. Finley, owner of Oakland A's 1960–81 (born in Alabama)
John Huston Finley, educator, New York Times editor
Michael Finley, pro basketball player, film producer
Katie Finneran, actress
Allison Finney, golfer
Mauro Fiore, Oscar-winning cinematographer (born in Italy)
Harvey S. Firestone Jr., chairman of Firestone Tire and Rubber Company
Bill Fischer, lineman for NFL's Chicago Cardinals, member of College Football Hall of Fame
Bobby Fischer, world chess champion
Leo Fischer, sports journalist, basketball executive
John Fischetti, 1969 Pulitzer Prize-winning cartoonist (born in New York)
Bud Fisher, cartoonist, Mutt and Jeff
Eileen Fisher, fashion designer (born in New York)
George M.C. Fisher, CEO of Eastman Kodak and Motorola
Steve Fisher, basketball coach for San Diego State, coached 1989 NCAA champion Michigan
Carlton Fisk, Hall of Fame catcher for Red Sox and White Sox (born in Vermont)
Jack Fisk, film director, Oscar-nominated art and production designer, husband of Sissy Spacek
Horatio Fitch, silver medalist in 400 meters at 1924 Summer Olympics
John Fitzgerald, two-time Olympian in pentathlon
Pat Fitzgerald, football coach for Northwestern
Patrick Fitzgerald, U.S. Attorney, 2001–12 (born in New York)
Peter Fitzgerald, politician (Republican), U.S. Senator 1999–2005
John Fitzpatrick, catcher, 1,787 hits in minor leagues
Bob Fitzsimmons, boxing heavyweight champion (born in England) 
Five Stairsteps, singing group, "O-o-h Child"
Max Flack, outfielder, played in 1918 World Series
The Flamingos, singing group, "I Only Have Eyes for You"
Crista Flanagan, comedic actress, MADtv
Walter Flanigan, co-founder of National Football League
Michael Flatley, dancer and choreographer, Lord of the Dance
P. J. Fleck, football head coach, Western Michigan
Coby Fleener, tight end for Indianapolis Colts
Darius Fleming, linebacker for Notre Dame and New England Patriots
Bill Flemming, sportscaster
Art Fletcher, MLB player, coach and manager
Darrin Fletcher, MLB catcher 1989–2002
Calista Flockhart, actress, Ally McBeal, wife of Harrison Ford
Milton S. Florsheim, founder of Florsheim shoe company
Paul Flory, Nobel Prize-winning chemist
Cliff Floyd, outfielder for seven Major League teams
Fahey Flynn, Chicago radio-TV journalist (born in Michigan)
John Flynn, director, screenwriter, Rolling Thunder, The Outfit, Out for Justice, Lock Up
Neil Flynn, actor, Scrubs, The Middle

Fo–Fp

Dan Fogelberg, folk/rock musician and composer
Lee Fogolin, NHL player 1974–87
Pat Foley, hockey broadcaster
Thomas C. Foley, U.S. Ambassador to Ireland 2006–09
Tim Foley, 10-year defensive back for Miami Dolphins
Mike Foltynewicz, MLB pitcher
Art Folz, banned NFL player
Ralph Foody, actor, Home Alone, Code of Silence
Tom Foran, U.S. Attorney, chief prosecutor of Chicago Seven trial
Betty Ford, 1974–1977 First Lady of the United States, founder of Betty Ford Center
Dorothy Ayer Gardner Ford, mother of President Gerald Ford
Harrison Ford, Oscar-nominated actor, Indiana Jones films, original Star Wars trilogy, Blade Runner, Patriot Games, Air Force One, The Fugitive, 42
Judith Ford, 1969 Miss America
Percy Ford, auto racer, third in 1921 Indy 500
Ruth VanSickle Ford, painter, director of Chicago Academy of Fine Arts
Thomas Ford, 8th Governor of Illinois (born in Pennsylvania)
Carl Foreman, Oscar-winning screenwriter, High Noon, The Bridge on the River Kwai, The Guns of Navarone
James Forman, Civil Rights leader 
Harry Forrester, basketball coach
Josephine Forsberg, improv coach, Second City, Players Workshop
Aldo Forte, NFL player and coach
Frank Foss, pole vaulter, 1920 Summer Olympics gold medalist
George Edmund Foss, U.S. Representative 1895–1913
Bob Fosse, Oscar and Tony-winning choreographer, director, Cabaret, Sweet Charity, Lenny, Chicago, All That Jazz
Ray Fosse, catcher for five Major League teams
Steve Fossett, commodities trader, aviator, adventurer (born in Tennessee)
Bill Foster, politician (Democrat), U.S. Representative
Gloria Foster, actress, The Matrix
Greg Foster, hurdler, 10-time national champion, three-time world champion, 1984 Olympic silver medalist
Kevin Foster, MLB pitcher 1993–2001
Martin D. Foster, surgeon, mayor of Olney, U.S. Representative
Rube Foster, manager of Chicago American Giants, member of Baseball Hall of Fame (born in Texas)
Scott Michael Foster, actor, Greek, Chasing Life, Crazy Ex-Girlfriend
Susanna Foster, actress, Phantom of the Opera
David Foulis, Chicago golf pro and innovator (born in Scotland)
James Foulis, 1896 U.S. Open golf champion (born in Scotland)
Albert Fowler, mayor of Rockford 1864–68 (born in Massachusetts)
Bertha Fowler, educator, preacher, deaconess
Richard Fowler, radio show host, media personality, political activist, Fox News contributor
Carol Fox, opera impresario
Nellie Fox, Hall of Fame infielder for White Sox (born in Pennsylvania)
Terry Fox, MLB pitcher
Virgil Fox, organist
Redd Foxx, comedian and actor, Sanford and Son, Cotton Comes to Harlem, Harlem Nights
Bryan Foy, film producer

Fr–Fz

Clint Frank, football player for Yale, winner of 1937 Heisman Trophy
Melvin Frank, director and screenwriter, White Christmas, A Funny Thing Happened on the Way to the Forum
Pat Frank, journalist and author
Art Frantz, umpire, crew chief of 1975 World Series
Frank Frantz, final Governor of Oklahoma Territory
Dennis Franz, actor, NYPD Blue, Hill Street Blues, Dressed to Kill, American Buffalo, Psycho II, Die Hard 2
John E. Franz, organic chemist, discovered glyphosate
Jonathan Franzen, author
Chick Fraser, pitcher for 1907, 1908 champion Chicago Cubs
Laura Gardin Fraser, sculptor, coin designer
Bobby Frasor, basketball player, 2009 NCAA champion North Carolina
Jason Frasor, relief pitcher for Kansas City Royals
Harry Frazee, owned Boston Red Sox, traded Babe Ruth
Walt Frazier, Hall of Fame guard for Southern Illinois and New York Knicks (born in Georgia)
Andy Frederick, offensive lineman for two Super Bowl champions
John T. Frederick, literary scholar, professor (born in Iowa)
Bud Freeman, big-band saxophonist
Cassidy Freeman, actress, musician, Smallville, Longmire
Donnie Freeman, pro basketball player
Kathleen Freeman, actress, The Blues Brothers, The Nutty Professor, North to Alaska, Blues Brothers 2000
Marvin Freeman, MLB pitcher 1986–96
Russ Freeman, jazz pianist
Von Freeman, saxophonist
Paul Frees, voice actor
Augustus C. French, lawyer, Governor of Illinois 1846–53 (born in New Hampshire)
Arny Freytag, photographer
Betty Friedan, writer, activist, feminist, author of The Feminine Mystique
William Friedkin, Oscar-winning director, The Exorcist, The French Connection, Sorcerer, To Live and Die in L.A.
Leo Friedman, songwriter, "Let Me Call You Sweetheart"
Milton Friedman, Nobel Prize-winning economist
Friend & Lover, singing duo, "Reach out of the Darkness"
Owen Friend, MLB infielder 1949–56
Johnny Frigo, violinist, bassist and songwriter
Art Fromme, MLB pitcher 1906–15
Charles Sumner Frost, architect of Navy Pier Auditorium, LaSalle Street Station (born in Maine)
Jim Fuchs, two-time Olympic medalist, 1951 Pan Am Games shot put and discus champion
Nicholas J. Fuentes, paleoconservative political commentator, podcaster, activist
Francis Fukuyama, philosopher, political economist, author
Charles Eugene Fuller, U.S. Representative 1903–13, 1915–26
Jack Fuller, editor and publisher of Chicago Tribune
Loie Fuller, pioneer of modern dance
Melville Fuller, lawyer, editor, politician, Chief Justice of United States 1888–1910 (born in Maine)
R. Buckminster Fuller, scientist, architect, inventor, author
Hugh Fullerton, early 20th-century sportswriter, exposed Black Sox scandal
Xavier Fulton, tackle in Canadian Football League
Zach Fulton, offensive lineman for Kansas City Chiefs
Ivan Fuqua, relay gold medalist, 1932 Summer Olympics
George Furth, playwright, actor, Butch Cassidy and the Sundance Kid, Shampoo, Cannonball Run
Jules Furthman, Oscar-nominated screenwriter, Mutiny on the Bounty, To Have and Have Not, Rio Bravo

G
Ga–Gd

Marianne Gaba, actress, Miss Illinois USA 1957, Playboy Playmate
Andrew Gabel, speed skater, 1994 Olympic silver medalist
John Wayne Gacy, serial killer
Gadabout Gaddis, fly-fishing expert
Eddie Gaedel, baseball pinch-hitter
Belva Gaertner, inspiration for "Velma Kelly" in play and film Chicago
Gary Gaetti, third baseman, primarily for Minnesota Twins
Ben Gage, announcer, husband of Esther Williams
Lyman J. Gage, politician (Republican), banker and US Secretary of The Treasury (born in New York)
Frank Galati, screenwriter and playwright
Milt Galatzer, MLB outfielder 1933–39
George Washington Gale, namesake of Galesburg, founder of Knox College (born in New York)
Gladys Gale, singer and actress
Johnny Galecki, actor, Roseanne, The Big Bang Theory
Harry Gallatin, forward for New York Knicks, player and coach for Southern Illinois, basketball Hall of Fame
Mary Onahan Gallery, writer, editor 	
Tom Gallery, actor, married to ZaSu Pitts
Ralph Galloway, pro football player
Paul Galvin, founder of Motorola
Harry Gamage, football coach, South Dakota, Kentucky
Lu Gambino, football player, MVP of 1948 Gator Bowl
Kevin Gamble, player for four NBA teams
Mason Gamble, actor, Dennis the Menace, Spy Hard, Rushmore
James Gammon, actor, Nash Bridges, Revenge, Major League
Gale Gand, chef, television personality
Mike Gandy, NFL lineman 2001–09
Jeanne Gang, architect
Terry Gannon, sportscaster for Golf Channel
Rudolph Ganz, pianist, music educator (born in Switzerland)
Aimee Garcia, actress, Dexter, Greetings from Tucson, George Lopez
Dave Garcia, MLB manager
Barry Gardner, NFL player 1999–2006
Earle Gardner, MLB player 1908–1912
Robert Gardner, golfer, 2-time U.S. Amateur champion
Wix Garner, football coach, Western Illinois 1942–47
Jeff Garlin, actor, comedian, director, Curb Your Enthusiasm, Daddy Day Care, The Goldbergs
Lee Garmes, Oscar-winning cinematographer
Kevin Garnett, center for Minnesota Timberwolves, 2004 MVP of NBA (born in South Carolina)
Jimmy Garoppolo, quarterback, Eastern Illinois and New England Patriots
Scott Garrelts, baseball pitcher for San Francisco Giants
Darell Garretson, NBA referee
Augustus Garrett, land speculator, Mayor of Chicago 1843–46 (born in New York)
Dick Garrett, guard for four NBA teams
Harriet E. Garrison, physician; medical writer
Dave Garroway, Chicago radio-TV personality, first host of NBC's Today show (born in New York)
Jennie Garth, actress, Beverly Hills, 90210
Elbert Henry Gary, lawyer, county judge, corporate officer, a U.S. Steel founder; Gary, Indiana named for him
John Warne Gates, barbed wire mogul, founder of company that became Texaco
William Gates, subject of documentary Hoop Dreams
Bryan Gaul, pro soccer player
Janina Gavankar, actress, True Blood, The Mysteries of Laura
Hobart R. Gay, World War II general
Mitzi Gaynor, entertainer and actress, South Pacific, There's No Business Like Show Business, The Joker Is Wild, Les Girls

Ge–Gm

Jason Gedrick, actor, Iron Eagle, Boomtown, Murder One, Luck
Eric Gehrig, pro soccer player
Gary Geiger, outfielder for four MLB teams
Bill Geist, author, TV correspondent, CBS Sunday Morning
Willie Geist, co-host of MSNBC's Morning Joe and NBC's Today 
Larry Gelbart, Emmy-winning television and Oscar-nominated film writer, Tony-winning playwright
Michael Gelman, television producer
Angelo Genna, organized crime figure (born in Sicily)
Bill George, 13-year linebacker for Chicago Bears, member of Pro Football Hall of Fame (born in Pennsylvania)
Francis George, Roman Catholic cardinal, Archbishop of Chicago
Kenny George, among tallest basketball players in history
Phil Georgeff, horse-racing caller of more than 95,000 races
Sid Gepford, NFL player
Henry Gerber, gay rights activist (born in Germany)
Neva Gerber, early 20th-century actress
Jami Gertz, actress, Still Standing, Sibs, Twister, Less than Zero
Jody Gerut, MLB outfielder 2003–10
Charlie Getzien, 19th-century MLB pitcher
Tavi Gevinson, blogger and feminist
Georgie Anne Geyer, journalist and author
Carl Giammarese, lead vocalist of The Buckinghams
Sam Giancana, organized crime figure
John Giannini, basketball coach for La Salle University
Jim Gibbons, tight end for Detroit Lions 1958–68
Marla Gibbs, actress, The Jeffersons, 227, The Hughleys
Charles Gibson, television journalist and personality, ABC News and Good Morning, America
Diana Gibson, actress, Adventure's End, Behind the Headlines
Norwood Gibson, MLB pitcher 1903–06
Oliver Gibson, NFL defensive tackle
Emily Giffin, novelist
Barry Gifford, novelist, Wild at Heart
Florence Gilbert, silent-film actress
Warren Giles, National League president 1957–69, Hall of Fame
Zach Gilford, actor, Friday Night Lights
Kendall Gill, pro basketball player, commentator
Earl Gillespie, sportscaster
King C. Gillette, inventor of safety razor (born in Wisconsin)
Fred Gillies, tackle for Chicago Cardinals
Paul Gilmartin, comedian, podcaster, TV personality, Dinner and a Movie
Douglas H. Ginsburg, judge
Joe Girardi, manager of New York Yankees
Adele Givens, actress, The Hughleys, Queens of Comedy
Henry P. Glass, architect, Art Institute professor
Stephen Glass, journalist for The New Republic fired for fraud
Roy Gleason, outfielder, 1-for-1 in only MLB at-bat
Otis F. Glenn, lawyer, U.S. Senator 1928–33
Caroline Glick, journalist, deputy managing editor of Jerusalem Post
Joseph Glidden, patented barbed wire (born in New York)
Gina Glocksen, 2-time American Idol contestant
Al Glossop, MLB infielder 1939–46
Bruce Glover, actor, Diamonds Are Forever, Chinatown

Go–Gq

Bob Goalby, professional golfer, winner of 1968 Masters Tournament
George Gobel, comedian, musician and Emmy Award-winning actor
Godfrey, comedian, actor
Timothy Goebel, figure skater, 2002 Olympics bronze medalist
John D. Goeken, founder of MCI Inc and Airfone
Harold Goettler, World War I aviator
Mike Goff, NFL guard 1998–2009
Gracie Gold, U.S. champion figure skater (born in Massachusetts)
Albert Goldbarth, poet
Arthur Goldberg, U.S. Secretary of Labor 1961–62, Ambassador to U.N. 1965–68
Barry Goldberg, keyboardist, record producer
Bertrand Goldberg, architect, designer of Marina City
Sarah Goldberg, actress, 7th Heaven
Grant Golden (1929-2018), tennis player
Jack Golden, NFL linebacker 2000–03
James Goldman, playwright and screenwriter, The Lion in Winter, Nicholas and Alexandra, Robin and Marian
Ronald Goldman, murder victim in O. J. Simpson trial
William Goldman, author, Oscar-winning screenwriter, Butch Cassidy and the Sundance Kid, All the President's Men, The Princess Bride
Arlene Golonka, actress, Mayberry R.F.D., Hang 'Em High, The Busy Body
Andrew Golota, heavyweight contender, 1988 Summer Olympics medalist
Jaslene Gonzalez, fashion model, winner of America's Next Top Model Cycle 8
Benny Goodman, musician and bandleader, recipient of Grammy Lifetime Achievement Award
Steve Goodman, singer-songwriter, "City of New Orleans"
William O. Goodman, lumber tycoon, founder of Goodman Theater (born in Pennsylvania)
Charles Goodnight, cattle baron and trailblazer
Andrew Goodpaster, U.S. Army general, NATO Supreme Commander, superintendent of West Point
Ron Gora, swimmer, NCAA and Pan-Am Games champion
Alicia Goranson, actress, Roseanne, Boys Don't Cry
Seth Gordon, director, Horrible Bosses, Identity Thief
Stuart Gordon, director, writer, producer, Re-Animator
Edward Gorey, artist and writer
Ken Gorgal, defensive back, 1950, 1954 NFL champion
Mark Gorski, cyclist, gold medalist in 1984 Summer Olympics
Tom Gorzelanny, pitcher for 5 MLB teams
Freeman Gosden, co-creator and star of Amos 'n' Andy
Tuffy Gosewisch, catcher for Arizona Diamondbacks
Jeff Gossett, NFL punter 1981–96
Sue Gossick, diver, gold medalist in 1968 Summer Olympics
Robert Gottschalk, cameraman, founder of Panavision
Chester Gould, creator of Dick Tracy (born in Oklahoma)

Gra–Grd

Harry Grabiner, longtime White Sox executive
Jim Grabowski, MVP of 1964 Rose Bowl, running back for Chicago Bears and Green Bay Packers, broadcaster
Joe Grace, MLB outfielder 1938–47
Thomas Joseph Grady, archbishop of Orlando, Florida
Joseph V. Graff, lawyer, U.S. Representative 1895–1911 (born in Indiana)
Billy Graham, evangelist (born in North Carolina)
Bruce Graham, architect of Sears Tower and John Hancock Center (born in Colombia)
Kent Graham, NFL quarterback 1992–2002
Otto Graham, Hall of Fame quarterback for Cleveland Browns, head coach for Washington Redskins
Nancy Lee Grahn, actress, General Hospital, Santa Barbara
Peaches Graham, early 20th-century ballplayer
Stedman Graham, businessman, partner of Oprah Winfrey
Judy Grahn, poet
Billy Grammer, musician, "Detroit City"
Curtis Granderson, outfielder for New York Mets
Red Grange, college and pro Hall of Fame football player (born in Pennsylvania)
Bill Granger, novelist and journalist (born in Wisconsin)
Bob Grant, radio personality
Frederick Dent Grant, soldier, diplomat, son of President Ulysses S. Grant
James Grant, first president of Chicago and Rock Island Railroad
James Edward Grant, screenwriter, The Alamo, Hondo, McLintock!
Mark Grant, MLB pitcher 1984–93, broadcaster
Michael Grant, boxer
Ulysses S. Grant, commander of Illinois regiment, Civil War general and 18th President of the United States (1869–1877) (born in Ohio)
Ulysses S. Grant III, soldier, city planner, grandson of U.S. Grant
Cammi Granato, captain of 1998 Winter Olympics gold-medal U.S. women's hockey team, Hockey Hall of Fame
Tony Granato, player for three NHL teams, head coach of Colorado Avalanche 2002–04
Bonita Granville, film actress and TV producer, Nancy Drew franchise, The Glass Key, Now, Voyager
Laura Granville, professional tennis player
Nick Gravenites, blues musician
Catt Gravitt, songwriter
Beatrice Gray, actress
Charles McNeill Gray, candle maker, Mayor of Chicago 1853–54 (born in New York)
Clifford Gray, two-time gold medalist in 1932 Winter Olympics bobsled
Dolores Gray, actress, Designing Woman, It's Always Fair Weather, Kismet, The Opposite Sex
Glen Gray, bandleader and musician
Harold Gray, creator of Little Orphan Annie
Kenneth J. Gray, Air Force combat pilot, U.S. Representative 1955–89
William S. Gray, co-created Dick and Jane stories
Eli Grba, MLB pitcher 1959–63

Gre–Grz

Luke Gregerson, baseball pitcher for Houston Astros
Virginia Gregg, actress
John Milton Gregory, first president of University of Illinois
Wilton Daniel Gregory, archbishop of Atlanta
Andrew Greeley, Roman Catholic priest, sociologist, columnist and author
Chad Green, pitcher for the New York Yankees (born in South Carolina)
Dwight H. Green, 1941–49 Governor of Illinois, prosecutor of Al Capone (born in Indiana)
Rickey Green, guard for eight NBA teams
Shawn Green, MLB 2-time All Star outfielder 1993–2007, had 4-homer game
Seymour Greenberg, 4-time US Open tennis quarterfinalist
Robert Greenblatt, chairman of NBC television entertainment
Dan Greenburg, author, husband of Nora Ephron
Gene Greene, ragtime musician
Kevin Greene, linebacker for five NFL teams
Shecky Greene, comedian and actor, Tony Rome, History of the World, Part I, Splash
Ralph Greenleaf, pocket billiards Hall of Fame
Sam Greenlee, novelist, government agent
Luke Gregerson, relief pitcher for Houston Astros
Rose Gregorio, Tony Award-nominated actress
Brian Gregory, head basketball coach at Georgia Tech
John Milton Gregory, first president of University of Illinois
Matt Grevers, 2-time relay gold medalist in 2008 Olympic Games, backstroke gold in 2012 Olympics
Elmer Grey, architect of The Beverly Hills Hotel
Tom Gries, director, Will Penny, 100 Rifles, Breakheart Pass
Kenneth C. Griffin, financier, philanthropist (born in Florida)
Johnny Griffin, bop sax musician
Kathy Griffin, actress, Emmy-winning comedian, My Life on the D-List, Fashion Police
Marion Mahony Griffin, pioneering architect
Montell Griffin, boxer, WBC light-heavyweight champ
Walter Burley Griffin, architect, associated with Frank Lloyd Wright
Charles B. Griffith, screenwriter, Little Shop of Horrors, Death Race 2000, Eat My Dust!
Howard Griffith, NFL running back 1991–2001, 8-TD game for Illinois
John L. Griffith, first commissioner of Big Ten Conference
Rashard Griffith, pro basketball player
Yolanda Griffith, 2000 and 2004 Olympic basketball gold medalist, 8-time WNBA All-Star, 1999 league MVP
Boomer Grigsby, NFL fullback 2005–09
Dennis Grimaldi, Broadway choreographer, producer
Charlie Grimm, player and manager for Cubs (born in Missouri)
Gary Groh, golfer
Bob Groom, MLB pitcher 1909–18
Mary Gross, actress, Saturday Night Live, Feds, The Couch Trip, Troop Beverly Hills
Michael Gross, actor, Family Ties, Big Business, The Young and the Restless, Tremors
Johnny Groth, MLB outfielder 1946–60
Orval Grove, pitcher for White Sox 1940–49 (born in Kansas)
Sophie Naylor Grubb, activist, writer, lecturer
Johnny Gruelle, cartoonist, creator of Raggedy Ann
Dov Grumet-Morris (born 1982), professional ice hockey player
Tim Grunhard, NFL center 1990–2000
John M. Grunsfeld, astronaut and physicist
Glen Grunwald, general manager of New York Knicks, Toronto Raptors

Gs–Gz

Lisa Guerrero, model and television personality
Ozzie Guillén, infielder, manager for White Sox (born in Venezuela)
Charles J. Guiteau, assassin of President James A. Garfield
Bill Gullickson, MLB pitcher 1979–94 (born in Minnesota)
Bryant Gumbel, television journalist (born in Louisiana)
Greg Gumbel, television sportscaster (born in Louisiana)
Frank W. Gunsaulus, educator, orator and minister (born in Ohio)
Charles F. Gunther, confectioner, introduced CrackerJack (born in Germany)
John Gunther, foreign correspondent and author
Larry Gura, pitcher for Kansas City Royals and Chicago Cubs
Walter S. Gurnee, tannery owner, Mayor of Chicago 1851–53; Gurnee named for him (born in New York)
Andy Gustafson, football coach, Virginia Tech, Miami
Frankie Gustine, MLB infielder 1939–50
Luke Guthrie, golfer
Luis Gutiérrez, politician (Democrat), U.S. Representative
Buddy Guy, blues guitarist, Grammy Lifetime Achievement Award
A.J. Guyton, basketball player
Boone Guyton, test pilot, aviation pioneer
Brad Guzan, professional soccer goalkeeper

H
Haa–Ham

Bert Haas, MLB first baseman 1937–51
Carl Haas, auto racing executive
Jay Haas, pro golfer, 9-time PGA Tour winner (born in Missouri)
Jerry Haas, pro golfer, college coach
Stan Hack, player and manager for Chicago Cubs (born in California)
Warren Hacker, MLB pitcher 1948–61
Gene Hackman, Oscar-winning actor, The French Connection, Superman, Hoosiers, Unforgiven (born in California)
H. G. Hadden, 1895 football player-coach for Notre Dame
Jerry Hadley, operatic tenor
Mickey Haefner, MLB pitcher 1943–50
Jean Hagen, Oscar-nominated actress, Singin' in the Rain, Adam's Rib, The Asphalt Jungle, Make Room for Daddy
Kevin Hagen, actor, Little House on the Prairie
Hager Twins, country music duo
Michael G. Hagerty, actor, Lucky Louie, Friends
Tyjuan Hagler, NFL player
Kathryn Hahn, actress, Crossing Jordan, Step Brothers, We're the Millers
John Charles Haines, water commissioner, Mayor of Chicago 1858–60 (born in New York)
Jerry Hairston Jr., baseball player for nine MLB teams
George Halas, co-founder of National Football League, coach-owner of Chicago Bears, member of Pro Football Hall of Fame
George Halas Jr., president of Chicago Bears 1963–79
Walter Halas, basketball coach, Notre Dame, Drexel
Barbara Hale, Emmy-winning actress, Della Street on Perry Mason
DeMarlo Hale, bench coach for the Toronto Blue Jays
George E. Hale, astronomer
Arthur R. Hall, football player and coach for Illinois
Bryan Hall, defensive end for Baltimore Ravens
Buddy Hall, pocket billiards Hall of Fame
Edward K. Hall, football and baseball coach for Illinois
Glenn Hall, 10-year Hall of Fame goalie for Blackhawks (born in Canada)
Lani Hall, singer, wife of Herb Alpert
Gary Hallberg, pro golfer, sixth in 1985 Masters
Bill Haller, Major League Baseball umpire
Tom Haller, MLB catcher, coach, executive
Brett Halliday, mystery writer
Lin Halliday, saxophonist (born in Arkansas)
Robert Halperin, Olympic yachting medalist, football player, decorated World War II hero, chairman of Commercial Light Co.
Victor Halperin, film director, White Zombie
Halston, fashion designer (born in Iowa)
Roy Hamey, general manager of New York Yankees 1960–63
Dorothy Hamill, figure skater, gold medalist in 1976 Winter Olympics and 1976 world champion
Earl Hamilton, MLB pitcher 1911–24
Frank Hamilton, singer with The Weavers
John B. Hamilton, U.S. Surgeon General 1879–91
John Marshall Hamilton, Governor of Illinois 1883–85 (born in Ohio)
Todd Hamilton, professional golfer, winner of 2004 British Open
Penny Hammel, professional golfer
Richard Hamming, prominent mathematician, inventor of the Hamming code and Hamming window
John Hammond, general manager of Orlando Magic, Milwaukee Bucks
Laurens Hammond, inventor of Hammond organ
Dan Hampton, Hall of Fame defensive end for Chicago Bears (born in Arkansas)

Han–Har

Herbie Hancock, jazz musician, Grammy and Oscar winner
Elliot Handler, co-founder of Mattel toy company
Phil Handler (1908–1968), NFL football player and coach
Jam Handy, Olympic swimmer (born in Pennsylvania)
Daryl Hannah, actress, Splash, Blade Runner, Wall Street, Steel Magnolias, Kill Bill
Lorraine Hansberry, playwright, A Raisin in the Sun
Henry C. Hansbrough, U.S. Senator of North Dakota 1891–1909
Brian Hansen, speed skater, 2010 Winter Olympics silver medalist
Chris Hansen, television journalist
Joseph T. Hansen, labor leader
Myrna Hansen, 1953 Miss USA, actress
Mark Victor Hansen, co-creator of Chicken Soup for the Soul
Snipe Hansen, MLB pitcher 1930–35
Ray Hanson, football coach, Western Illinois 1926–41 (born in Minnesota)
Robert Hanssen, FBI agent convicted of espionage
Norman Hapgood, editor, ambassador to Denmark 1919
J. A. Happ, relief pitcher for the New York Yankees
Luke Harangody, professional basketball power forward
Clay Harbor, professional football tight end
James Harbord, World War I general, chairman of RCA
Tim Hardaway, NBA player 1989–2003 and 2000 Sydney Olympics
Abner C. Harding, Civil War officer, U.S. Representative (born in Connecticut)
Cory Hardrict, actor, American Sniper
Alan Hargesheimer, MLB pitcher 1980–86
Cory Harkey, professional football tight end and fullback
James Harlan, Iowa senator, U.S. Secretary of the Interior, son-in-law of Abraham Lincoln
John Marshall Harlan II, justice of U.S. Supreme Court 1955–71
Chic Harley, running back, College Football Hall of Fame
Jean Harlow, actress, Lake Forest student (born in Missouri)
Deborah Harmon, actress, Just the Ten of Us, Used Cars
Merle Harmon, sports broadcaster
Reginald C. Harmon, Air Force general
Ann Harnett, pro baseball player
Elise Harney, pro baseball player
Sheldon Harnick, lyricist, Fiddler on the Roof
Erika Harold, model, 2003 Miss America, conservative activist, attorney
Dawn Harper, hurdler, gold medalist in 2008 Beijing Olympics
Jesse Harper, football coach for Notre Dame 1913–17
Jessica Harper, actress, My Favorite Year, Stardust Memories, Pennies from Heaven, Suspiria
Michael Harper, basketball player, North Park and Portland Trail Blazers
William Rainey Harper, first president of University of Chicago and Bradley (born in Ohio)
Ken Harrelson, baseball player, executive, broadcaster (born in South Carolina)
Will Harridge, president of baseball's American League 1931–59
Arne Harris, television sports producer
Barbara Harris, Oscar-nominated actress, Nashville, Plaza Suite, Family Plot, Freaky Friday
E.B. Harris, 25-year president of Chicago Mercantile Exchange
Eddie Harris, saxophonist
Emily Harris, kidnapper of Patty Hearst
Harry Harris, boxer
Janet Harris, member of Women's Basketball Hall of Fame
Moira Harris, actress, One More Saturday Night, Breakdown, wife of Gary Sinise
Napoleon Harris, linebacker in NFL, member of Illinois Senate
Patricia Roberts Harris, Cabinet member of President Jimmy Carter
Paul P. Harris, founder of Rotary International (born in Wisconsin)
Robin Harris, comedian and actor, House Party, Do the Right Thing
Steve Harris, actor, The Practice
Sydney J. Harris, syndicated columnist (born in England)
Wood Harris, actor, The Wire
Carter Harrison Sr., politician (Democrat), U.S. Representative, Mayor of Chicago 1879–1887, 1893 (born in Kentucky)
Carter Harrison Jr., politician (Democrat), Mayor of Chicago 1897–1905, 1911–15
Nolan Harrison, NFL defensive end 1991–2000
Rodney Harrison, NFL defensive back, won two Super Bowls with New England Patriots
Dolores Hart, actress, Loving You, Lonelyhearts, Sail a Crooked Ship, Where the Boys Are
Jim Hart, quarterback for NFL's St. Louis Cardinals 1966–83
Pearl M. Hart, attorney and activist
Justin Hartley, actor, Passions, The Young and the Restless, Smallville
Mary Hartline, television personality, Super Circus
Johnny Hartman, jazz singer
Gabby Hartnett, Hall of Fame catcher for Chicago Cubs (born in Rhode Island)
Lynne Cooper Harvey, radio producer (born in Missouri)
Paul Harvey, radio personality, Chicago-based for more than 60 years (born in Oklahoma)

Has–Haz

Karen Hasara, politician (Republican), first female mayor of Springfield
Dennis Hastert, teacher, politician (Republican), U.S. Representative, Speaker of the House 1998–2006
Wilbur Hatch, bandleader, I Love Lucy
Donny Hathaway, singer, "Where Is the Love"
Helge Alexander Haugan, businessman, banker (born in Norway)
H. (Hauman) G. Haugan, railroad executive, brother of Helge A. Haugan (born in Norway)
Reidar Rye Haugan, newspaper publisher (born in Norway)
Enid A. Haupt, magazine publisher, philanthropist
Herbert Hans Haupt, executed spy (born in Germany)
June Haver, actress, The Daughter of Rosie O'Grady, The Dolly Sisters, Look for the Silver Lining, wife of Fred MacMurray
Brent Hawkins, pro football player 2006–13
Coleman Hawkins, saxophonist
Fred Hawkins, golfer, co-runnerup in 1958 Masters Tournament
Hersey Hawkins, guard for five NBA teams
LaRoyce Hawkins, actor, Chicago P.D.
Tom Hawkins, basketball player, baseball executive
John Hay, secretary to Abe Lincoln, U.S. Secretary of State under William McKinley and Theodore Roosevelt (born in Indiana)
Kelvin Hayden, NFL cornerback 2005–14, won Super Bowl XLI
Julie Haydon, actress, The Scoundrel, The Conquerors
Bernadene Hayes, actress, Idiot's Delight, Dick Tracy's Dilemma
Bill Hayes, actor, Days of Our Lives
Billie Hayes, actress, Li'l Abner
Charles Hayes, union official, U.S. Representative 1983–93
Reggie Hayes, actor, Girlfriends
Sean Hayes, Emmy-winning actor, Will & Grace, The Bucket List, Martin and Lewis, The Three Stooges
Kathryn Hays, actress, As the World Turns
Reggie Hayward, defensive end for Denver Broncos and Jacksonville Jaguars
Hurley Haywood, auto racer in Motorsports Hall of Fame of America

He–Hh

Luther Head, basketball player, 2005 Illinois national runners-up
Nathan Heald, commandant of Fort Dearborn 1810–12 (born in New Hampshire)
Egyptian Healy, 19th-century pitcher
George Peter Alexander Healy, painter (born in Massachusetts)
Pat Healy, actor
Jane Heap, writer and publisher (born in Kansas)
Chick Hearn, Hall of Fame basketball broadcaster for Los Angeles Lakers
Monroe Heath, politician (Republican), Mayor of Chicago 1876–79 (born in New Hampshire)
Erin Heatherton, fashion model
Harry Hebner, three-time Olympian, 1912 backstroke gold medalist
Ben Hecht, reporter, war correspondent, author, activist, playwright, director, Academy Award-winning screenwriter
Bobby "The Brain" Heenan, professional wrestler, manager, TV commentator
Kyle T. Heffner, actor, Flashdance, When Harry Met Sally..., Runaway Train
Richard T. Heffron, director, I, the Jury, Futureworld, Outlaw Blues
Christie Hefner, former Playboy company CEO
Hugh Hefner, magazine publisher, founder of Playboy
James V. Heidinger, U.S. Representative 1941–45
Mike Heimerdinger, assistant coach for Denver Broncos and Tennessee Titans
Don Heinrich, NFL quarterback 1953–62 and coach, College Football Hall of Fame
Marg Helgenberger, actress, Northwestern alumna, CSI (born in Nebraska)
William Heirens, convicted murderer, served 65 years in prison
James Meredith Helm, admiral, Spanish–American War
Ernest Hemingway, iconic author, Pulitzer and Nobel Prize-winning journalist and novelist
Terri Hemmert, Chicago radio personality (born in Ohio)
Bill Henderson, jazz singer, actor
Rickey Henderson, Hall of Fame outfielder, holds MLB record for career stolen bases
Thomas J. Henderson, Civil War general, U.S. Representative (born in Tennessee)
Jack Hendricks, manager of Cincinnati Reds 1924–29
Sue Hendrickson, paleontologist, discoverer of Sue the dinosaur
Tim Hendryx, MLB outfielder 1911–21
Max Henius, biochemist, co-founder of American Academy of Brewing
Marilu Henner, actress, author, Taxi, Noises Off, Johnny Dangerously, L.A. Story
Anne Henning, speed skater, 1992 Olympic gold medalist (born in North Carolina)
John W. Henry, businessman and investor, owner of the Boston Red Sox and The Boston Globe
Ken Henry, speed skater, gold medalist in 1952 Winter Olympics
Roy Henshaw, MLB pitcher 1933–44
Kelley Menighan Hensley, actress, As the World Turns
Lou Henson, 21-year head coach of Illinois basketball (born in Oklahoma)
Craig Hentrich, NFL punter 1993–2009
Herblock (Herbert Block), cartoonist, winner of three Pulitzer Prizes
William Herndon, law partner and biographer of Abe Lincoln, mayor of Springfield
James B. Herrick, physician who discovered sickle-cell disease
Clarence Herschberger, All-American athlete for University of Chicago 1894–98
Seymour Hersh, Pulitzer-winning investigative journalist
John D. Hertz, founder of Yellow Cab Company and The Hertz Corporation (born in Hungary)
Whitey Herzog, outfielder, Hall of Fame baseball manager, primarily with St. Louis Cardinals
Charlton Heston, Oscar-winning actor, political activist, The Ten Commandments, Ben-Hur, El Cid, The Greatest Show on Earth, The Agony and the Ecstasy, Touch of Evil, Planet of the Apes
Willie Heston, halfback, College Football Hall of Fame

Hi–Hn

John Grier Hibben, president of Princeton University 1912–32
Jesse Hibbs, football player for USC, film and TV director
Jim Hickey, pitching coach for Tampa Bay Rays
Kevin Hickey, pitcher for White Sox and Baltimore Orioles
Fred Hickman, sportscaster
Wild Bill Hickok, Wild West gunfighter and lawman
Hal Higdon, runner and writer
Joan Higginbotham, astronaut
Jack Higgins, cartoonist, 1989 Pulitzer Prize winner
Joel Higgins, actor, Silver Spoons
Rod Higgins, forward for seven NBA tams, executive for Charlotte Hornets
Andy High, MLB third baseman 1922–34
Nat Hiken, creator, Car 54, Where Are You?, The Phil Silvers Show
Ernest Hilgard, psychologist
Homer Hillebrand, MLB player 1905–08
Chuck Hiller, MLB player, hit grand slam home run in 1962 World Series
Charles T. Hinde, founder of Hotel del Coronado (born in Ohio)
Harry Hinde, Missouri politician, aircraft designer
Thomas S. Hinde, founder of Mount Carmel, friend of Mark Twain
Earl Hines, jazz musician (born in Pennsylvania)
Garrett Hines, bobsled silver medalist at 2002 Salt Lake City Olympics
Tony Hinkle, basketball coach (born in Indiana)
Chris Hinton, tackle for Indianapolis Colts and Atlanta Falcons
Milt Hinton, jazz musician (born in Mississippi)
Edward Hirsch, poet and critic
Lew Hitch, won two NBA championships with Minneapolis Lakers
Michael Hitchcock, actor, MADtv, Wild Hogs, Glee
Les Hite, bandleader
Robert R. Hitt, U.S. Representative 1882–1906 (born in Ohio)

Ho–Ht

Edward Francis Hoban, archbishop of Cleveland, Ohio 1945–66
Glen Hobbie, pitcher for Chicago Cubs 1957–64
Mellody Hobson, executive, chairperson of DreamWorks Animation, married to George Lucas
Nathan Hodel, NFL center 2001–09
Art Hodes, jazz pianist
John R. Hodge, commanding general of U.S. Third Army
Craig Hodges, NBA guard, primarily with Milwaukee Bucks and Chicago Bulls
Reggie Hodges, NFL punter 2005–12
Tom Hoff, volleyball player, gold medalist in 2008 Beijing Olympics
Guy Hoffman, pitcher in MLB and Japan
Julius Hoffman, judge in trial of Chicago Seven
Isabella Hofmann, actress, Dear John, Homicide: Life on the Street, JAG
Paul G. Hoffman, auto executive and statesman
James F. Hoge Jr., editor and publisher of Chicago Sun-Times, New York Daily News
Helen E. Hokinson, cartoonist for The New Yorker
William Holabird, architect (born in New York)
Stu Holcomb, GM of White Sox and Chicago Mustangs soccer, Northwestern athletic director
Jennifer Holden, actress, Buchanan Rides Alone, Jailhouse Rock
William Holden, Oscar-winning actor, Stalag 17, Sunset Boulevard, Born Yesterday, The Bridge on the River Kwai, Picnic, The Wild Bunch, Network
Tony Holguin, golfer
Nicole Hollander, creator of comic strip Sylvia
Mabel Holle, baseball player
Robert W. Holley, biochemist, 1968 Nobel Prize
Loleatta Holloway, singer
Red Holloway, jazz musician
Celeste Holm, Academy Award-winning actress, Gentleman's Agreement, All About Eve (born in New York)
Andre Holmes, wide receiver for Oakland Raiders
H. H. Holmes, serial killer (born in New Hampshire)
Mary Emma Holmes, reformer, suffragist, and educator
Phyllis Holmes, basketball coach, Women's Basketball Hall of Fame
Nick Holonyak, engineer and educator
Lester Holt, Chicago newscaster 1986–2000 (born in California)
Jerome Holtzman, baseball writer and historian
Ken Holtzman, pitcher for University of Illinois, Cubs, Oakland A's, three-time World Series winner
Joseph R. Holzapple, U.S. Air Force four-star general
Dianne Holum, speed skater, Olympic gold medalist
Skip Homeier, actor, The Gunfighter, The Tall T, Comanche Station
John Honnold (1915–2011), law professor at the University of Pennsylvania Law School
Hector Honore, auto racer
Henry Honore, 19th-century real estate baron (born in Kentucky)
Ida Marie Honore, socialite, daughter-in-law of Ulysses S. Grant (born in Kentucky)
Raymond Hood, architect of Tribune Tower and Rockefeller Center (born in Rhode Island)
Jay Hook, MLB pitcher 1957–64
Michael Hoomanawanui, tight end for New Orleans Saints, New England Patriots
Albert J. Hopkins, U.S. Representative 1885–1903, U.S. Senator 1903–09
Fred Hopkins, jazz musician
John Patrick Hopkins, politician (Democrat), Mayor of Chicago 1893–95
Michael S. Hopkins, astronaut, Illinois football player
Jeff Hornacek, NBA player 1986–2000, head coach of New York Knicks, Phoenix Suns
Henry Horner, politician (Democrat), Governor of Illinois 1933–40
Rogers Hornsby, Hall of Fame infielder, manager for Chicago Cubs (born in Texas)
Big Walter Horton, harmonica player in Blues Hall of Fame
Kathleen Horvath, pro tennis player
Arnold Horween, All-American for Harvard, NFL player
Ralph Horween, All-American for Harvard, NFL player
Frances Horwich, television personality, Miss Frances, host of Ding Dong School
Stanley Hough, horse racing trainer
Lin Houston, guard for 1950 NFL champion Cleveland Browns
Charles Edward Hovey, Civil War general, Peoria school superintendent, first president of Illinois State (born in Vermont)
Richard Hovey, poet
Juwan Howard, forward for Michigan and eight NBA teams; two championships with Miami Heat
Margo Howard, writer, daughter of Ann Landers
Miki Howard, singer
Terrence Howard, actor, Iron Man, Big Momma's House, Lee Daniels' 'The Butler', Empire
Tom Howard, photographer
Dick Howell, swimmer, 1924 Summer Olympics relay gold
George Evan Howell, judge, U.S. Representative 1941–47
Yvonne Howell, actress, wife of director George Stevens
Howlin' Wolf, blues musician (born in Mississippi)

Hu–Hz

Elbert Hubbard, writer, died on RMS Lusitania
Trenidad Hubbard, MLB outfielder 1994–2003
Edwin Hubble, astronomer
Janet Hubert, singer, actress, Fresh Prince of Bel Air
Reginald Hudlin, film director, producer, The Great White Hype, Django Unchained
Warrington Hudlin, film director, producer, House Party, Boomerang
Jennifer Hudson, R&B singer, Oscar-winning actress, Dreamgirls
Michael Hudson, economist
Otis Hudson, NFL lineman 2010–14
Rock Hudson, actor, Giant, Magnificent Obsession, Pillow Talk, A Farewell to Arms, Ice Station Zebra, McMillan and Wife
Troy Hudson, NBA guard 1998–2008
George Huff, 19th-century football and baseball coach for Illinois, athletic director 1901–35
Brandon Hughes, NFL cornerback 2009–14
Carol Hughes, actress, Flash Gordon Conquers the Universe
Jim Hughes, MLB pitcher 1952–57
John Hughes, director, producer, screenwriter, Ferris Bueller's Day Off, The Breakfast Club, Home Alone (born in Michigan)
John R. Hughes, cowboy, trail driver, Texas Ranger
Kim Hughes, pro basketball center and coach
Mary Beth Hughes, actress, The Ox-Bow Incident, Dressed to Kill, Caged Fury, Loophole, The Lady Confesses
Matt Hughes, mixed martial artist, UFC Hall of Fame
Tom Hughes, MLB pitcher 1900–13
Wayne Huizenga, founder of Blockbuster video, former owner of Miami Dolphins, Florida Marlins
William Hulbert, baseball pioneer, president of Chicago White Stockings, who became the Cubs (born in New York)
Tim Hulett, MLB player and coach
Bobby Hull, Hall of Fame wing for Chicago Blackhawks (born in Canada)
Morton D. Hull, lawyer, U.S. Representative 1923–33
William E. Hull, postmaster of Peoria, U.S. Representative 1923–33
Randy Hultgren, U.S. Representative
Edward Hume, TV writer, The Day After
Paul Hume, music critic
Rick Hummel, baseball writer
Todd Hundley, catcher for several MLB teams (born in Virginia)
Murray Humphreys, organized crime figure
William L. Hungate, U.S. Representative of Missouri 1964–77
Chuck Hunsinger, pro football player
Bonnie Hunt, actress, director, talk-show host, Beethoven, Jerry Maguire, Cheaper by the Dozen, Return to Me
Jarvis Hunt, architect
Lester C. Hunt, U.S. Senator and Governor of Wyoming
Marsha Hunt, actress, Raw Deal, Panama Hattie, Johnny Got His Gun, Carnegie Hall
H. L. Hunt, oil tycoon
Myron Hunt, architect of Rose Bowl stadium (born in Massachusetts)
Stephen Hunter, novelist, Pulitzer Prize-winning critic (born in Missouri)
Steven Hunter, center for four NBA teams
Stephen A. Hurlbut, lawyer, Civil War general, ambassador (born in South Carolina)
John Huston, pro golfer
Ken Huszagh, swimmer, 1912 Olympic Games gold medalist
Robert Maynard Hutchins, lawyer, educator, president of University of Chicago (born in New York)
Ina Ray Hutton, entertainer and bandleader
June Hutton, singer and actress
J.B. Hutto, blues musician (born in South Carolina)
Dick Hyde, MLB pitcher 1955–61
Henry J. Hyde, politician (Republican), U.S. Representative 1975–2007, chaired House Judiciary Committee
Ida Henrietta Hyde, physiologist and professor (born in Iowa)
J. Allen Hynek, astronomer, UFO authority

I

Harold L. Ickes, U.S. Secretary of the Interior under FDR and Truman (born in Pennsylvania)
Harold Iddings, college football, basketball coach
Andre Iguodala, player for Golden State Warriors, 2015 NBA Finals MVP
Tunch Ilkin, lineman, broadcaster for Pittsburgh Steelers
Margaret Illington, silent-film actress
Roger Imhof, actor
The Impressions, R&B group, Rock and Roll Hall of Fame
Ebon C. Ingersoll, U.S. Representative 1864–70 (born in New York)
Robert G. Ingersoll, Illinois Attorney General, reformer (born in New York)
Lloyd Ingraham, actor and director
Mark Ingram Sr., NFL wide receiver 1987–96, father of Heisman Trophy winner Mark Ingram II
Rex Ingram, actor, The Adventures of Huckleberry Finn, Sahara, Cabin in the Sky, Your Cheatin' Heart
Jeff Innis, pitcher for New York Mets 1987–93
Samuel Insull, industrialist, builder of Chicago Opera House (born in England)
George Ireland, coach of Loyola team that won 1963 NCAA basketball championship (born in Wisconsin)
Jim Irsay, owner of NFL's Indianapolis Colts
Robert Irsay, owned Baltimore and Indianapolis Colts 1972–97
Dick Irvin, coach and first captain of Chicago Blackhawks (born in Canada)
Wilson Irvine, impressionist painter
Charlie Irwin, MLB infielder 1893–1902
Ivan Irwin, NHL player, New York Rangers, Montreal Canadiens
Tom Irwin, actor, Saving Grace, My So-Called Life, Related
Jason Isringhausen, relief pitcher for six MLB teams
Dan Issel, Hall of Fame basketball player, University of Kentucky, Denver Nuggets, NBA coach and GM
Burl Ives, Oscar-winning actor, The Big Country, Cat on a Hot Tin Roof; folk musician ("A Holly Jolly Christmas")
Judith Ivey, Tony Award-winning actress, Sister, Sister, Brighton Beach Memoirs, The Woman in Red (born in Texas)
Eugene Izzi, novelist working in hardboiled crime fiction

J
Ja–Jn

Ray Jablonski, MLB infielder 1953–59
Adoree Jackson, USC and NFL wide receiver
Frisman Jackson, NFL wide receiver 2002–07
Jesse Jackson, political activist and candidate, Baptist minister, TV commentator (born in South Carolina)
Jesse Jackson Jr., U.S. Representative, tendered resignation 2012
Leroy Jackson, 3-time state 100-yard dash champion, NFL running back
Mahalia Jackson, gospel singer, Grammy Lifetime Achievement Award (born in Louisiana)
Mannie Jackson, owner of Harlem Globetrotters
Mark Jackson, wide receiver, played in three Super Bowl games
Michael Jackson, iconic pop singer (born in Indiana)
Phil Jackson, Hall of Fame coach of six-time NBA champion Chicago Bulls (born in Montana)
Shoeless Joe Jackson, outfielder for Black Sox banned from baseball (born in South Carolina)
Wilfred Jackson, animator, director of Disney's Fantasia, Dumbo, Cinderella, Snow White and the Seven Dwarfs
Harry Jacobs, pro linebacker 1960–72, two AFL championships
Jim Jacobs, composer, Grease
Colombe Jacobsen, chef and actress
Baby Doll Jacobson, MLB outfielder 1915–27
Peter Jacobson, actor, House, Transformers, Ray Donovan
Walter Jacobson, television news journalist
Scott Jacoby, actor
Andrea Jaeger, tennis player, Wimbledon and French Open finalist
Evan Jager, distance runner, U.S. record holder in 3000m steeplechase
Tom Jager, swimmer, five-time Olympic champion, 11-time U.S. champion
Helmut Jahn, architect (born in Germany)
John Jakes, author, The Kent Family Chronicles, North and South
Ahmad Jamal, jazz pianist
Brian James, basketball coach
Edmund J. James, president of University of Illinois 1904–20
Joni James, singer, "Why Don't You Believe Me?"
Louis N. James, golfer, 1902 U.S. Amateur champion
Peter Francis James, actor, voice-over artist
William James, NFL defensive back 2001–10
Joyce Jameson, actress
Bob Jamieson, television journalist
Dick Jamieson, football coach 1972–97
Jim Jamieson, pro golfer (born in Michigan)
Bob Janecyk, NHL goalie 1983–89
Bill Janklow, 16-year Governor of South Dakota
Natalie Jaresko, minister of finance, Ukraine
Joseph Jarman, jazz musician and Buddhist priest (born in Arkansas)
Valerie Jarrett, senior advisor to President Barack Obama
Pat Jarvis, pitcher for Montreal Expos and Atlanta Braves
Ray Jauch, football player and coach
Dick Jauron, NFL defensive back, head coach of Buffalo Bills, Chicago Bears and Detroit Lions
Dave Jauss, baseball coach and scout
William Jayne, first governor of Dakota Territory 1861–63
Betty Jaynes, singer and actress (born in Tennessee)
Robert Jeangerard, Olympic basketball gold medalist
Denise Jefferson, director Alvin Ailey American Dance Theater 1984–2010
Thomas B. Jeffery, 19th-century auto and bicycle pioneer (born in England)
Mae Jemison, physician and astronaut (born in Alabama)
Joe Jemsek, golfer and owner of Cog Hill golf course
Edward H. Jenison, publisher, Naval commander, U.S. Representative (born in Wisconsin)
Ella Jenkins, educator, Grammy-winning singer
Ferguson Jenkins, Hall of Fame pitcher for Chicago Cubs (born in Canada)
LaTasha Jenkins, sprinter
Leroy Jenkins, violinist
Richard Jenkins, Oscar-nominated, Emmy-winning actor, The Visitor, Six Feet Under, Step Brothers, Olive Kitteridge
James M. Jenness, CEO of Kellogg's 2004–06
William Le Baron Jenney, architect, originator of metal-frame skyscraper
William Sherman Jennings, 18th Governor of Florida
Derrick Jensen, tight end for Oakland Raiders 1979–86
Jens Jensen, landscape architect (born in Denmark)
Jeremih, R&B singer
Garry Jestadt, MLB infielder 1969–72
Rob Jeter, basketball coach (born in Pennsylvania)
Sam Jethroe, outfielder, 1950 National League Rookie of the Year
Martin C. Jischke, president of Iowa State and Purdue

Jo–Jz

Anton J. Johnson, dairy executive, mayor of Macomb, U.S. Representative
Armon Johnson, point guard for Portland Trail Blazers 2010–12
Arnold Johnson, owner of MLB's Philadelphia and Kansas City Athletics
Arte Johnson, actor, Rowan & Martin's Laugh-In
Bob Johnson, pitcher for five Major League teams
Bobby Johnson, wide receiver for New York Giants 1984–86
Carrie Ashton Johnson, newspaper editor, writer, suffragist 
Charles R. Johnson, scholar, novelist, author of Middle Passage
Chic Johnson, comedian, Olsen and Johnson
Curley Johnson, player for Harlem Globetrotters
Diane Johnson, author and screenwriter, Le Divorce, The Shining
Don Johnson, MLB player, last Cub to bat in World Series before 2016
Eddie Johnson, player for six NBA teams
Ernie Johnson, MLB shortstop 1912–25
George E. Johnson Sr., cosmetics executive (born in Mississippi)
Howard Wesley Johnson, president of MIT, chairman of board of trustees
Jake Johnson, actor, New Girl
Jan Johnson, 3-time NCAA pole vault champion, 1972 Olympic medalist
Jim Johnson, defensive coordinator for Notre Dame, NFL teams
John H. Johnson, publisher of Ebony, Jet (born in Arkansas)
Lynn-Holly Johnson, professional ice skater and actress
Mickey Johnson, NBA forward 1974–86
Nancy Johnson, U.S. Representative for Connecticut 1983–2007
Phillip E. Johnson, professor, father of intelligent design movement
Raylee Johnson, NFL defensive end 1993–2003
Richard Johnson, defensive back for Houston Oilers
Robert L. Johnson, founder of Black Entertainment Television, owned Charlotte Bobcats (born in Mississippi)
Sheila Johnson, philanthropist, owner of Washington Mystics
Syleena Johnson, singer and TV personality
Timothy V. Johnson, politician (Republican), U.S. Representative 2001–13
Luke Johnsos, player and coach for Chicago Bears
Bruce Johnston, singer for Beach Boys, composer of "I Write the Songs"
J. J. Johnston, actor, boxing historian
Louis Jolliet, explorer, early Illinois territory settler (born in Canada)
Adam Jones, Grammy-winning guitarist
Amanda Jones, 1973 Miss USA, first runner-up Miss Universe
Austin Jones, former YouTuber, musician, and a capella artist
Barbara Jones, sprinter, 1952 and 1960 Olympic relay golds
Darryl Jones, guitarist for The Rolling Stones
David Jones, physician, second owner of NFL's Chicago Cardinals
Earl Jones, athlete, 800 meters bronze in 1984 Summer Olympics
Esther Jones, sprinter, 1992 Summer Olympics relay gold
Garrett Jones, first baseman and outfielder for the New York Yankees
Hoppy Jones, original member of singing group The Ink Spots
James Jones, author, From Here to Eternity, Some Came Running, The Thin Red Line
Jo Jones, drummer for Count Basie
Mary Harris Jones, labor organizer (born in Ireland)
Melvin Jones, founder of Lions Club International (born in Arizona)
Ralph Jones, coach of Chicago Bears, basketball coach at Purdue, Illinois and Butler (born in Indiana)
Quincy Jones, musician, conductor, producer, arranger, composer, film composer, Grammy Legend Award
Rickie Lee Jones, Grammy-winning singer and songwriter
Sam J. Jones, actor, Flash Gordon, 10, Ted
Wesley Livsey Jones, U.S. Senator of Washington 1909–32
Bob Jordan, television journalist (born in Georgia)
Clifford Jordan, jazz musician
Jim Jordan, actor, radio's Fibber McGee and Molly
John Jordan, basketball coach for Loyola and Notre Dame
Marian Driscoll Jordan, actress, Fibber McGee and Molly
Michael Jordan, basketball player, NCAA champion, two-time Olympic champion, six-time NBA champion for Chicago Bulls, owner of Charlotte Hornets (born in North Carolina)
Reggie Jordan, NBA guard 1994–2000
Art Jorgens, MLB catcher 1929–39 (born in Norway)
Orville Jorgens, MLB pitcher 1935–37
Ron and Vivian Joseph, Olympic pairs skaters
Al Joyner, athlete, gold medalist in triple jump at 1984 Summer Olympics
Jackie Joyner-Kersee, athlete, UCLA basketball and track, four-time Olympian, three golds, six medals
Tom Joyner, radio personality
Norman B. Judd, U.S. Representative 1867–71 (born in New York)
Howie Judson, pitcher for Chicago White Sox, Cincinnati Reds
Sylvia Shaw Judson, sculptor
Whitcomb L. Judson, inventor of the zipper
John Jurkovic, football player, radio personality
Herb Juul, MLB pitcher, Illinois basketball player, coach

K
Ka–Kg

Ted Kaczynski, notorious Unabomber criminal
Mike Kafka, NFL and Northwestern quarterback
Gus Kahn, songwriter, "I'll See You in My Dreams" (born in Germany)
James Kahn, writer of Star Wars novels, television producer
Harry Kalas, Hall of Fame sportscaster for Philadelphia Phillies
Floyd Kalber, longtime Chicago television journalist (born in Nebraska)
Frank Kaminsky, center for NBA's Charlotte Hornets
Stuart M. Kaminsky, mystery novelist
Elias Kane, judge, first Illinois Secretary of State, U.S. Senator 1825–35 (born in New York)
Marjorie Kane, actress, The Dentist, The Loud Mouth
Patrick Kane, three-time Stanley Cup champion with Chicago Blackhawks (born in New York)
Maria Kanellis, WWE professional wrestler
Kraig Kann, Golf Channel personality, LPGA official
Henry Kaplan, pioneer in radiation therapy and radiobiology
Irving Kaplansky, mathematician at University of Chicago
Jack Kapp, founder of Decca Records
Chris Kappler, Olympic equestrian gold medalist
Frederick J. Karch, World War II and Vietnam general
Fred Karger, political consultant
Fred Karlin, songwriter, "For All We Know"
Phil Karlson, film director, Kid Galahad, Kansas City Confidential, The Silencers, Walking Tall
Roberta Karmel (born 1937), Centennial Professor of Law at Brooklyn Law School, and first female Commissioner of the U.S. Securities and Exchange Commission.
Johnny Karras, halfback for Illinois 1952 Rose Bowl champions
Ted Karras, center for the New England Patriots
Kevin Kasper, wide receiver for eight NFL teams
Leon Kass, physician, scientist, educator, public intellectual
Chuck Kassel, NFL player 1927–33
Terry Kath, musician with band Chicago
Stana Katic, actress, Castle
Philip Kaufman, film director, The Right Stuff, The Unbearable Lightness of Being, Rising Sun
Tony Kaufmann, MLB pitcher 1921–35
Herminie Templeton Kavanagh, writer, Darby O'Gill and the Little People (born in England)
Kenneth Kays, decorated soldier
Marilyn Kaytor, food writer
Tim Kazurinsky, actor, comedian, Saturday Night Live, Police Academy
Bill Keating, lineman, 1965 Rose Bowl champion Michigan
Tom Keating, NFL defensive tackle 1964–75
Julie Kedzie, mixed martial artist
Howard Keel, actor, singer, Seven Brides for Seven Brothers, Kiss Me Kate, Kismet, Calamity Jane, Dallas
James Keeley, newspaper publisher (born in England)
John L. Keeley Jr., investment manager and philanthropist
Leslie Keeley, physician, founder of Keeley Institute for addiction treatment
Cody Keenan, speechwriter for President Barack Obama
Rosalind Keith, actress, Criminals of the Air, Trouble in Sundown
Kent E. Keller, U.S. Representative 1931–41
Sheldon Keller, comedy writer
Barry Kelley, actor
Florence Kelley, social reformer, founder of National Consumers' League (born in Pennsylvania)
Mike Kelley, creator of TV series Revenge
Dennis Kelly, offensive tackle for Philadelphia Eagles
Edward Joseph Kelly, 14-year Mayor of Chicago
Harry Kelly, decorated World War I soldier, Governor of Michigan
James Kelly, founder of Chicago Tribune
Megyn Kelly, NBC journalist, host of Megyn Kelly Today
R. Kelly, singer and songwriter
Robin Kelly, politician (Democrat), U.S. Representative
Caren Kemner, volleyball player, bronze medal in 1992 Summer Olympics
Mike Kenn, tackle for Atlanta Falcons, starter in 251 NFL games
Michael Kenna, saloonkeeper, Chicago alderman
Bob Kennedy, manager of Chicago Cubs and Oakland Athletics
Christopher G. Kennedy, president of Merchandise Mart, university trustee, nephew of John F. Kennedy (born in Massachusetts)
D. James Kennedy, pastor, Christian broadcaster
Ethel Kennedy, widow of U.S. senator and attorney general Robert F. Kennedy, awarded Presidential Medal of Freedom
John Kennedy, MLB infielder 1962–74
Madge Kennedy, actress, The Marrying Kind, Lust for Life
Merna Kennedy, actress, wife of Busby Berkeley
Martin H. Kennelly, Mayor of Chicago 1948–55
Ernie Kent, basketball head coach for Washington State and Oregon
Mel Kenyon, auto racer, five top-5 finishes in Indy 500
Robert Keohane, co-founder of the neoliberalism school of thought
Hugh Keough, horse racing official and sportswriter
Joe E. Kernan, Governor of Indiana 2003–05
Otto Kerner Jr., Governor of Illinois 1961–68
Johnny Kerr, NBA player, coach, broadcaster for Chicago Bulls, member of basketball Hall of Fame
Walter Kerr, Broadway drama critic
Jack Kerris, Loyola and pro basketball player
Donald Kerst, physicist, worked on Manhattan Project
Brian Kerwin, actor, Murphy's Romance, Love Field, Torch Song Trilogy, 27 Dresses, Beggars and Choosers
Joseph Kerwin, astronaut and physician
T'Keyah Crystal Keymáh, actress, That's So Raven, Cosby, In Living Color
Madison Keys, tennis player, 2017 U.S. Open runner-up

Kh–Kn

Chaka Khan, singer, multiple Grammy Award winner
Fazlur Khan, designer of John Hancock Center, Willis Tower (born in India)
Shahid Khan, owner, Jacksonville Jaguars (born in Pakistan)
Gerald Frederick Kicanas, archbishop of Tucson, Arizona
John Kidd, NFL punter 1984–98
Adolph Kiefer, swimmer, backstroke gold medalist in 1936 Olympics
Richard Kiley, actor, Blackboard Jungle, A Year in the Life, Man of La Mancha, The Phenix City Story, Looking for Mr. Goodbar
Dorothy Kilgallen, columnist, game show panelist
Philip G. Killey, director of Air National Guard
James M. Kilts, CEO of Gillette
William Wallace Kimball, piano manufacturer (born in Maine)
Elbert Kimbrough, defensive back for San Francisco 49ers 1962–66
Kyle Kinane, stand-up comedian
Bill King, radio voice, Oakland A's, Raiders, Golden State Warriors
Bradley King, early Hollywood screenwriter
Edward John King, 7-term U.S. Representative (born in Massachusetts)
Frank King, cartoonist, creator of Gasoline Alley (born in Wisconsin)
Freddie King, musician in Blues Hall of Fame (born in Texas)
Ginevra King, socialite
Ray King, MLB pitcher 1999–2008
Wayne King, bandleader
Dave Kingman, 15-year MLB outfielder (born in Oregon)
Sam Kinison, stand-up comedian, actor (born in Washington)
Terry Kinney, actor, Oz, The Unusuals, Sleepers, The Firm, co-founder of the Steppenwolf Theatre Company
William Kinney, lieutenant governor 1826–30 (born in Kentucky)
John Kinsella, swimmer, gold medalist at 1972 Summer Olympics
Juliet Magill Kinzie, historian (born in Connecticut)
John Kinzie, early Chicago settler (born in Ireland)
John H. Kinzie, trader, Chicago politician (born in Canada)
Adam Kinzinger, Air Force pilot, politician (Republican), U.S. Representative
Jason Kipnis, second baseman for Cleveland Indians
Bob Kipper, MLB pitcher 1985–92
George Kirby, comedian
Rollin Kirby, cartoonist
Mark Kirk, politician (Republican), U.S. Representative and U.S. Senator of Illinois
Jimmy Kite, auto racer
Kurt Kittner, football quarterback
Tom Kivisto, basketball player, businessman
Nick Kladis, basketball player, businessman, part-owner of Chicago White Sox, St. Louis Cardinals
Billy Klaus, MLB player
Bobby Klaus, MLB player
Gary Kleck, criminologist, Florida State University Professor Emeritus
Chris Klein, actor, American Pie film series, Rollerball
Dick Klein, first owner, general manager of Chicago Bulls (born in Iowa)
Dick Klein, tackle for Chicago Bears, Dallas Cowboys
Josh Kline, offensive guard for the New England Patriots
William G. Kline, basketball and baseball coach, Nebraska and Florida
Frank Klopas, soccer player, coach of Chicago Fire
Karlie Kloss, fashion model
John C. Kluczynski, politician (Democrat), U.S. Representative 1951–75
Ted Kluszewski, first baseman for Cincinnati Reds, Chicago White Sox, hit 3 home runs in 1959 World Series
Philip Klutznick, U.S. Secretary of Commerce 1980–81, Chicago Bulls president 1973 (born in Missouri)
Anthony L. Knapp, U.S. Representative 1861–65 (born in New York)
Robert M. Knapp, U.S. Representative 1873–79 (born in New York)
Willie Knapp, jockey in Hall of Fame, winner of 1918 Kentucky Derby
Chad Knaus, NASCAR crew chief
Alexa Scimeca Knierim, figure skater, 2015 national pairs champion
Joe Knollenberg, U.S. Representative of Michigan 1993–2009
Oscar Knop, NFL halfback 1920–27
Frank Knox, newspaper publisher/owner and Secretary of the Navy (born in Massachusetts)

Ko–Kz

Tom Koch, writer for Mad magazine
Leo Kocialkowski, tax appraiser, U.S. Representative 1933–43
Dave Kocourek, tight end in 7 AFL title games
Dave Koechner, actor, Second City, Anchorman (born in Missouri)
Walter Koenig, actor, Star Trek
Gustav Koerner, lieutenant governor, Abe Lincoln aide (born in Germany)
Bob Koester, founder of Delmark Records (born in Kansas)
Seana Kofoed, actress, Men in Trees
Herman Kogan, journalist
Rick Kogan, journalist
H. H. Kohlsaat, newspaper publisher
Dick Kokos, MLB outfielder 1948–54
Dan Kolb, MLB pitcher 1999–2007
Gary Kolb, MLB outfielder 1960–69
Darlene Koldenhoven, Grammy Award-winning singer
Henry Kolker, actor, Holiday, Union Pacific
Fred Koller, songwriter
Don Kolloway, MLB infielder 1940–53
Bonnie Koloc, folk singer (born in Iowa)
Lou Kolls, football player, MLB umpire
Mort Kondracke, political commentator, columnist for Roll Call
Paul Konerko, 15-year first baseman for White Sox (born in Rhode Island)
Lee Konitz, saxophonist
George Kontos, relief pitcher for San Francisco Giants
David Kopay, pro running back, author, gay rights activist
Harvey Korman, actor and comedian, The Carol Burnett Show, Blazing Saddles, History of the World, Part I, High Anxiety
Sidney Korshak, labor lawyer
Eddie Kotal, pro football player
Glenn Kotche, drummer
Arlene Kotil, pro baseball player
Irene Kotowicz, pro baseball player
George Kotsiopoulos, TV personality, Fashion Police
Rich Koz, television personality Svengoolie
Joe Krakoski, NFL defensive back 1961–66
Irene Kral, singer
Roy Kral, jazz musician
Olof Krans, Swedish-American folk art painter and artist
Nelson G. Kraschel, Governor of Iowa 1937–39
Jerry Krause, general manager of six-time NBA champion Chicago Bulls
Moose Krause, four-sport athlete, coach, athletic director for Notre Dame
Alison Krauss, bluegrass musician and composer
Mike Kreevich, MLB outfielder 1931–45
Frederick Kreismann, mayor of St. Louis 1909–13
Rich Kreitling, NFL wide receiver 1959–64
Gary Kremen, founder of Match.com
John Kriza, ballet dancer
Ray Kroc, CEO of McDonald's, owned San Diego Padres
Egil Krogh, lawyer, aide to President Richard Nixon, Watergate figure
Ian Krol, MLB pitcher
Candace Kroslak, actress, Ocean Ave.
Bill Krueger, pitcher for eight MLB teams
Ernie Krueger, MLB catcher 1913–25
Gene Krupa, drummer, subject of film The Gene Krupa Story
Todd Krygier, hockey player for Washington Capitals and Anaheim Ducks
Mike Krzyzewski, basketball coach for Duke University, five NCAA championships, 2008 and 2012 Olympic gold medals, Hall of Fame
Steve Kuberski, forward for Boston Celtics and Milwaukee Bucks
Daniel Kucera, Catholic bishop, Illinois Benedictine president
Jonathan Kuck, speed skater, 2010 Winter Olympics silver medalist
John Kuenster, editor of Baseball Digest, author
Mickey Kuhn, actor
George Kunz, lineman for Atlanta Falcons, Baltimore Colts
Stanley H. Kunz, thoroughbred breeder, U.S. Representative 1921–33 (born in Pennsylvania)
Irv Kupcinet, newspaper columnist, broadcaster
Karyn Kupcinet, actress, murder victim
C.J. Kupec, center for Michigan and the Los Angeles Lakers
Bill Kurtis, television news journalist (born in Florida)
Emil Kush, pitcher for Chicago Cubs 1941–49
Sarah Kustok, sportscaster
Zak Kustok, Northwestern quarterback
Ken Kwapis, TV and film director, The Office, The Sisterhood of the Traveling Pants, He's Just Not That Into You

L

La–Ld

Walter LaBerge, Under Secretary of Army, Air Force, NATO
Harry Lachman, film director, Dante's Inferno, Our Relations
Bob Lackey, basketball player for Marquette and ABA's New York Nets
Ethel Lackie, swimmer, two gold medals in 1924 Summer Olympics
Matt LaCosse, tight end for the New England Patriots
Tyler Ladendorf, second baseman for the Oakland Athletics
Carl Laemmle, motion picture mogul (born in Germany)
Carl Laemmle Jr., head of Universal Pictures
Carla Laemmle, silent-film actress
A.G. Lafley, CEO of Procter & Gamble (born in New Hampshire)
Jewel Lafontant, attorney, figure in George H. W. Bush administration
Kyung Lah, Tokyo-based international correspondent for CNN
Ray LaHood, politician (Republican), state and U.S. Representative, U.S. Secretary of Transportation 2009–13
Bill Laimbeer, basketball player and coach (born in Massachusetts)
Frankie Laine, singer and actor, known for themes to 3:10 to Yuma, Gunfight at the O.K. Corral, Rawhide, Blazing Saddles
Jean La Lime, early Chicago settler (born in Canada)
Ricardo Lamas, mixed martial-arts fighter
Derek Lamely, golfer
Robert Lamm, musician, songwriter for band Chicago
Gene Lamont, MLB catcher, coach and manager
Robert P. Lamont, U.S. Secretary of Commerce 1927–32 (born in Michigan)
Amy Landecker, actress, A Serious Man, Louie, Transparent
Ann Landers (Ruth Crowley, Eppie Lederer), advice columnist
James Landis, noted power engineer
Jessie Royce Landis, actress, North by Northwest, To Catch a Thief
John Landis, film director, National Lampoon's Animal House, The Blues Brothers, Trading Places, Michael Jackson's Thriller
Kenesaw Mountain Landis, judge, baseball commissioner, banned eight Black Sox (born in Ohio)
Reed G. Landis, combat pilot, son of Judge Landis
Margaret Landon, author, Anna and the King of Siam (born in Wisconsin)
Truman H. Landon, Air Force general (born in Missouri)
Hobie Landrith, catcher for seven MLB teams
Mabel Landry, 4-time U.S. champion in long jump
Eric Lane, actor
Matteo Lane, comedian
Nora Lane, actress, The Man Hunter, The Cisco Kid
Tami Lane, Oscar-winning makeup artist
Will Lang Jr., war correspondent, bureau chief for Life magazine
Mary Lewis Langworthy, president, Chicago Woman's Club
Harris Laning, admiral
Sherry Lansing, actress and CEO of Paramount Pictures
Lauren Lapkus, actress, Orange Is the New Black, Are You There, Chelsea?, Clipped, Jurassic World
Alison LaPlaca, actress, Open House, Madhouse
Angelo J. LaPietra, mobster with Chicago Outfit
John Lardner, war correspondent, New York sportswriter
Ring Lardner, early 20th-century sportswriter, author, composer, lyricist (born in Michigan)
Ring Lardner Jr., Oscar-winning screenwriter, Woman of the Year, The Cincinnati Kid, M*A*S*H
Rod La Rocque, actor, The Locked Door, Forbidden Paradise
Norm Larsen, industrial chemist, inventor of WD-40
René-Robert Cavelier, Sieur de La Salle, explorer
Kirke La Shelle, reporter, editor, playwright, producer
Albert Lasker, advertising executive, co-owned Chicago Cubs 1916–25 (born in Germany)
Jonathan Latimer, author and screenwriter
Johnny Lattner, football player, Heisman Trophy winner for Notre Dame
Arnold Laven, director and producer, The Rifleman, The Big Valley, Rough Night in Jericho, Sam Whiskey
Hazel Lavery, artist and model
Jackie LaVine, swimmer, 1952 Olympic bronze medalist
Ralph Lawler, radio-TV broadcaster of Los Angeles Clippers
Carol Lawrence, singer and actress
George R. Lawrence, photographer and aviator
Robert Henry Lawrence Jr., jet pilot and astronaut
Victor F. Lawson, publisher of Chicago Daily News 1876–1925
Don Laz, pole vaulter, silver medalist in 1952 Summer Olympics

Le–Lh

Cloris Leachman, Oscar-winning, 8-time Emmy-winning actress, The Last Picture Show, Mary Tyler Moore, 1946 Miss Illinois (born in Iowa)
Brett Lebda, NHL defenseman 2005–11
Mike Lebovitz, stand-up comedian
Pepi Lederer, silent-film actress
Ang Lee, Oscar-winning director, Illinois alumnus
Doug Lee, NBA player 1991–95
Mary Lee, actress, Cowboy and the Senorita, South of the Border
Russell Lee, photographer
Dan LeFevour, pro football quarterback
Joan Lefkow, judge (born in Kansas)
Lance LeGault, actor, The A-Team
Ernest de Koven Leffingwell, explorer
Natasha Leggero, comedian, judge on Last Comic Standing
Charlie Leibrandt, MLB pitcher 1979–93
Lefty Leifield, MLB pitcher 1905–20
Levi Leiter, co-founder of Marshall Field & Co., president of Art Institute of Chicago
Mark Leiter, pitcher for eight MLB teams
Charles LeMaire, Oscar-winning costume designer
John LeMay, actor, Friday the 13th: The Series (born in Minnesota)
Walt Lemon Jr. (born 1992), American basketball player in the Israel Basketball Premier League
Don Lenhardt, player for four MLB teams
Harry Lennix, actor, Dollhouse, The Blacklist, Matrix films
Thomas Lennon, actor, comedian, Reno 911!, The State, Viva Variety
Rick Lenz, actor, Hec Ramsey, Cactus Flower, The Shootist
Dutch Leonard, pitcher for four MLB teams
Jack E. Leonard, comedian
Meyers Leonard, center for Portland Trail Blazers (born in Virginia)
Robert Z. Leonard, Oscar-nominated film director, The Great Ziegfeld, Pride and Prejudice, The Bribe
Leopold and Loeb, notorious murderers of 1924
Lawrence Leritz, dancer, actor
Leo Lerner, newspaper publisher
Jim Les, guard for four NBA teams, head coach of UC Davis
Mikel Leshoure, running back for Detroit Lions 2011–14
Amy Leslie, opera singer, journalist (born in Iowa)
Donald Leslie, inventor of the Leslie speaker
Buddy Lester, comedian and actor, Ocean's 11, The Nutty Professor
Jerry Lester, comedian, television personality
Ronnie Lester, guard for Chicago Bulls and Los Angeles Lakers
Tim Lester, quarterback and head coach, Western Michigan
Tracy Letts, Tony-winning actor, playwright, screenwriter, August: Osage County (born in Oklahoma)
Brian Levant, film director, The Flintstones, Beethoven, Snow Dogs, Are We There Yet?
Max Levchin, co-founder of PayPal and Yelp (born in Ukraine)
Mel Leven, songwriter
Edward H. Levi, U.S. Attorney General 1975–77
Charles Levin, actor, Alice, Capital News
Gabe Levin (born 1994), American-Israeli basketball player in the Israeli Basketball Premier League
Al Levine, pitcher for seven MLB teams
Samm Levine, actor
Ted Levine, actor, The Silence of the Lambs, Monk (born in Ohio)
King Levinsky, boxer, heavyweight contender
Steven Levitan, TV director, screenwriter and producer; creator of Just Shoot Me! and Modern Family*Steven Levitt, economist, author of Freakonomics
Marv Levy, coach and general manager for Buffalo Bills, member of Pro Football Hall of Fame
Greg Lewis, NFL wide receiver 2003–10
J. Hamilton Lewis, congressman for two states, U.S. Senator of Illinois (born in Virginia)
Lena Morrow Lewis, suffragist, Socialist
Meade Lux Lewis, jazz musician
Monica Lewis, singer and actress, The Strip, The D.I., Excuse My Dust, Affair with a Stranger
Ramsey Lewis, radio personality and Grammy Award-winning jazz musician, "The 'In' Crowd"
J.C. Leyendecker, illustrator (born in Germany)

Li–Ln

Anna Li, gymnast, NCAA champion for UCLA
Marcus Liberty, pro basketball player
George Lichty, cartoonist, Grin and Bear It
Dennis Lick, offensive tackle for Chicago Bears 1976–81
Don Liddle, pitcher for 1954 World Series champion New York Giants
Jeffrey Lieber, TV writer and producer, Lost
Jennifer Lien, actress, Star Trek: Voyager
DeAndre Liggins, pro basketball player
David E. Lilienthal, chairman, Atomic Energy Commission 1946–50
Arlene Limas, world and Olympic champion in taekwondo
Abbey Lincoln, singer and actress
Abraham Lincoln, 16th President of the United States, Illinois lawyer and legislator, writer of Gettysburg Address, issuer of Emancipation Proclamation (born in Kentucky)
Abraham Lincoln II, grandson of Abraham Lincoln
Jessie Harlan Lincoln, granddaughter of Abraham Lincoln
Mamie Lincoln, granddaughter of Abraham Lincoln
Mary Todd Lincoln, Abe Lincoln's wife (born in Kentucky, died in Illinois)
Robert Todd Lincoln, attorney, U.S. Ambassador to United Kingdom, Secretary of War, President of Pullman Company, Abe Lincoln's son
Tad Lincoln, youngest son of Abe Lincoln, died at 18
Thomas Lincoln, father of Abe Lincoln, lived in Illinois 1831–51 (born in Virginia)
Edward Lindberg, athlete, relay gold medalist in 1912 Summer Olympics
Jim Lindeman, MLB outfielder 1986–94
Fannie B. Linderman, educator, entertainer, and writer
Charles Magnus Lindgren, shipping executive (born in Sweden)
John R. Lindgren, banking executive, son of Charles M. Lindgren
Justa Lindgren, football player for Illinois 1898–1901, coach of 1904 Big Ten champions
Benjamin F. Lindheimer, horse racing, owner of Washington Park Race Track and Arlington Park
Vachel Lindsay, poet
Chuck Lindstrom, catcher, tripled in only MLB at-bat
Freddie Lindstrom, Hall of Fame third baseman
Ed Linke, MLB pitcher 1933–38
Art Linson, producer, The Untouchables, Heat, The Edge, Into the Wild
Dan Lipinski, politician (Democrat), U.S. Representative
William O. Lipinski, politician (Democrat), U.S. Representative 1993–2005
Clara Lipman, 19th-century stage actress
Johnny Lira, boxer, USBA lightweight champ
Peter Lisagor, journalist
Rusty Lisch, quarterback for Notre Dame and St. Louis Cardinals
Jerome Edward Listecki, archbishop of Milwaukee, Wisconsin
Little Walter, blues musician (born in Louisiana)
J. J. Liu, professional poker player (born in California)
Robert Livingston, actor, The Three Mesquiteers
Shaun Livingston, forward for 2015 NBA champion Golden State Warriors
Danny Lloyd, actor, The Shining
Scott Lloyd, basketball player
Vince Lloyd, baseball broadcaster

Lo–Lp

Dick Locher, Pulitzer Prize-winning cartoonist, writer-artist of Dick Tracy
Allan Loeb, screenwriter, Wall Street: Money Never Sleeps, The Switch
Marshall Loeb, magazine editor
Frank J. Loesch, chief of Chicago Crime Commission (born in New York)
Nils Lofgren, musician, member of Bruce Springsteen E Street Band
Johnny Loftus, Hall of Fame jockey, 2-time Kentucky Derby winner, 1919 Triple Crown
David Logan, 19th-century mayor of Portland, Oregon
Janice Logan, actress, Opened by Mistake, Dr. Cyclops
John A. Logan, politician (Democrat and Republican), Civil War general, U.S. Representative, U.S. Senator
John Alexander Logan Jr., soldier, Medal of Honor winner, killed in combat
John Logan, screenwriter, Any Given Sunday, Gladiator, The Aviator, Hugo, Skyfall (born in California)
Stephen T. Logan, law partner of Abe Lincoln
Gary Loizzo, musician with The American Breed
Joseph Lombardo, organized crime figure
Dutch Lonborg, basketball coach, Northwestern all-time leader in victories
Chuck Long, quarterback and coach, College Football Hall of Fame
Fred T. Long, baseball player, football coach
Herman Long, MLB infielder 1889–1904
Richard Long, actor, The Big Valley, Nanny and the Professor, Bourbon Street Beat, House on Haunted Hill
Shelley Long, actress, Second City, Northwestern, Cheers, Troop Beverly Hills, The Brady Bunch Movie (born in Indiana)
Frank Loomis, hurdler, gold medalist in 1920 Summer Olympics
Horatio G. Loomis, a founder of Chicago Board of Trade (born in Vermont)
John Patrick Looney, gangster from Rock Island, inspired character in Road to Perdition
Ramón E. López, space physicist
Robert Lord, Oscar-winning screenwriter
Robert Lorenz, film producer, American Sniper, Mystic River
Fred Lorenzen, auto racer, winner of 1965 Daytona 500
William Lorimer, banker and politician
Dave Losso, stand-up comedian
George Lott, 5-time U.S. doubles champion, 1931 US Open finalist
Julia Louis-Dreyfus, actress, Second City, The Practical Theatre Company, Northwestern, Seinfeld (born in New York)
Lee Loughnane, musician with band Chicago
Tony Lovato, musician, member of band Mest
Bob Love, 3-time All-Star forward for Chicago Bulls (born in Louisiana)
John Arthur Love, Governor of Colorado 1963–73
Elijah Lovejoy, abolitionist, editor (born in Maine)
Owen Lovejoy, minister, abolitionist, U.S. Representative (born in Maine)
Frank Orren Lowden, politician (Republican), U.S. Representative, Governor of Illinois 1917–21 (born in Minnesota)
Grover Lowdermilk, MLB pitcher 1909–20 (born in Indiana)
Fred Lowenthal, college football coach
Lynn Lowry, actress
Alexander Loyd, Mayor of Chicago 1840–41 (born in New York)
Jewell Loyd, basketball player, top pick of 2015 WNBA draft

Lq–Lz

Scott W. Lucas, lawyer, U.S. Representative, U.S. Senator
Sid Luckman, quarterbacked Chicago Bears to four NFL championships (born in New York)
Ludacris (Christopher Bridges), Grammy Award-winning rapper and actor, The Fast and the Furious
William H. Luers, ambassador to Czechoslovakia, Venezuela
Larry Lujack, radio personality (born in Iowa)
Ned Luke, actor, Grand Theft Auto V
Deanna Lund, actress, Land of the Giants
Helen Lundeberg, painter
Carl Lundgren, MLB pitcher 1902–09
Hamilton Luske, Oscar-winning animator, Mary Poppins
Greg Luzinski, outfielder for Chicago White Sox and 1980 World Series champion Philadelphia Phillies
Abe Lyman, bandleader
Jane Lynch, actress and comedian, Glee, The 40-Year-Old Virgin, Julie & Julia, A Mighty Wind, Hollywood Game Night
John Lynch, defensive back for Denver Broncos and Super Bowl XXXVII champion Tampa Bay Buccaneers
Jordan Lynch, quarterback for Northern Illinois and Edmonton Eskimos
Bird Lynn, catcher for 1917 World Series champion White Sox
Fred Lynn, outfielder for Boston Red Sox, California Angels, 1975 American League MVP
Ginger Lynn, adult-film actress
Janet Lynn, five-time U.S. champion figure skater
Marjorie Lynn, singer, National Barn Dance (born in Wisconsin)
Ted Lyons, 21-year pitcher for Chicago White Sox, member of Hall of Fame (born in Louisiana)
Evan Lysacek, figure skater, 2010 Winter Olympics gold medalist and 2009 world champion, Sullivan Award winner

M
Maa–Mag

Bernie Mac, actor, comedian, The Bernie Mac Show, Mr. 3000, Bad Santa, Ocean's Eleven and its sequels
Charles MacArthur, Oscar-winning screenwriter, Chicago journalist, playwright (born in Pennsylvania)
Hayes MacArthur, stand-up comedian, actor, writer, Angie Tribeca, Perfect Couples, The Game Plan
Franklyn MacCormack, radio personality
Charles B. Macdonald, won first U.S. Amateur tournament, built Chicago Golf Club (born in Canada)
Hazel MacDonald, film critic and war correspondent
Elaine "Spanky" MacFarlane, singer with Spanky and Our Gang
Justina Machado, actress, Six Feet Under, Missing, Three Rivers
Christy Mack, model, stripper, porn actress
Helen Mack, actress, His Girl Friday, The Son of Kong, She
Peter F. Mack Jr., pilot, 7-term U.S. Representative
Sam Mack, guard for five NBA teams
Pete Mackanin, manager for Cincinnati Reds, Philadelphia Phillies
Felix Mackiewicz, MLB outfielder 1941–47
Rob Mackowiak, outfielder for Pittsburgh Pirates and White Sox
Archibald MacLeish, poet and writer, three-time Pulitzer Prize winner
Fred MacMurray, actor, My Three Sons, Double Indemnity, The Caine Mutiny, The Absent-Minded Professor, The Apartment
Tress MacNeille, voice actress, The Simpsons, Futurama, Animaniacs
Bart Macomber, halfback for Illinois 1914–15 national champions
Earle S. MacPherson, automotive engineer, developed MacPherson strut
Franklin MacVeagh, banker, U.S. Secretary of the Treasury 1909–13 (born in Pennsylvania)
John Macy, civil service chief for Presidents Eisenhower and Kennedy
Martin B. Madden, U.S. Representative 1905–28 (born in England)
David M. Maddox, retired U.S. Army four-star general
Amy Madigan, Oscar-nominated actress, Carnivàle, Field of Dreams, Uncle Buck, Pollock, Gone Baby Gone
Edward Rell Madigan, U.S. Representative 1973–91, U.S. Secretary of Agriculture 1991–93
Lisa Madigan, Attorney General of Illinois
Michael Madigan, Speaker of House, state Democratic Party chairman
Slip Madigan, college football player, three-sport coach
Cleo Madison, silent-film actress
Sarah Danielle Madison, actress
Bill Madlock, third baseman, four-time MLB batting champion
Michael Madsen, actor, Reservoir Dogs, Kill Bill, The Natural, Thelma & Louise, Donnie Brasco, The Hateful Eight
Virginia Madsen, Oscar-nominated actress, Sideways, Candyman, Dune, The Number 23, The Rainmaker, Joy
Mike Magac, NFL lineman 1960–66
Mike Magee, soccer player for Chicago Fire
Corey Maggette, forward for six NBA teams
Magic Sam, blues musician (born in Mississippi)
Elizabeth Magie, inventor of game that became Monopoly
Sandra Magnus, astronaut, aboard final Space Shuttle
Christine Magnuson, swimmer, two-time Olympic medalist

Mah–Maq

Ron Mahay, relief pitcher for eight MLB teams
Maureen Maher, host of CBS series 48 Hours Mystery (born in Michigan)
John Lee Mahin, screenwriter, Treasure Island, Dr. Jekyll and Mr. Hyde, Show Boat
Jock Mahoney, actor, Tarzan films, Yancy Derringer
John Mahoney, actor, Marty Crane on Frasier, Moonstruck, Barton Fink, Primal Fear, Eight Men Out (born in England)
Vivian Maier, photographer, Finding Vivian Maier (born in New York)
Gil Mains, defensive tackle for Detroit Lions 1953–61
J. Earl Major, judge, U.S. Representative
Rebecca Makkai, novelist and short-story writer
Karl Malden, Oscar-winning actor, On the Waterfront, A Streetcar Named Desire, Gypsy, The Cincinnati Kid, Patton, The Streets of San Francisco
Terrence Malick, Oscar-nominated filmmaker, Days of Heaven, The Thin Red Line, Tree of Life
John Malkovich, Oscar-nominated actor, Con Air, In the Line of Fire, Rounders, Secretariat, RED, Being John Malkovich
Sax Mallard, jazz musician
Dorothy Malone, Oscar-winning actress, The Big Sleep, Written on the Wind, Man of a Thousand Faces, Peyton Place
Frank Maloney, college football coach
Jasper A. Maltby, Civil War general, gunsmith (born in Ohio)
David Mamet, Oscar-nominated screenwriter, Pulitzer Prize-winning playwright, director, Glengarry Glen Ross, The Verdict, Wag the Dog, Hoffa, The Untouchables
Gail Mancuso, TV director, Roseanne, Modern Family, Friends
Sammy Mandell, lightweight boxing champion 1926–30
Larry Manetti, actor, Magnum, P.I.
Harry Manfredini, film composer
Camryn Manheim, actress, The Practice, Ghost Whisperer
Lewis Manilow, real estate developer, co-founder of Museum of Contemporary Art, Chicago
Sebastian Maniscalco, stand-up comedian
Carol Mann, golfer, won 38 LPGA tournaments (born in New York)
James Robert Mann, politician (Republican), attorney, Chicago alderman, U.S. Representative 1897–1922
Michael Mann, television and Oscar-nominated film director, Miami Vice, Heat, The Insider, Manhunter, Collateral, Ali
Joe Mantegna, actor, voice actor, Criminal Minds, The Godfather Part III, House of Games, Joan of Arcadia, The Rat Pack, The Simpsons
Joe Mantello, actor and Broadway director
Jay Manuel, make-up artist, America's Next Top Model
Ray Manzarek, co-founder and keyboardist for The Doors

Mar–Mas

Paul Marcinkus, archbishop and president of Vatican Bank
Carol Marin, television and newspaper journalist
Edna Marion, actress
Shawn Marion, forward for Dallas Mavericks and U.S. Olympic team
Mary Beth Marley, figure skater
Jerry Markbreit, professional football referee
Gene Markey, screenwriter, decorated naval officer, Chicago Academy of Fine Arts alumnus, husband of Hedy Lamarr and Myrna Loy
Morris Markin, founder of Checker Motors Company, owner of Yellow Cab (born in Russia)
Harry Markowitz, Nobel Prize-winning economist
Clayton Marks, educator, soldier, banker and historian
Brit Marling, writer, actress, Another Earth, Arbitrage, Babylon
Jess Marlow, television journalist
Jacques Marquette, 17th-century explorer (born in France)
Frank Clarence Mars, candy maker (born in Minnesota)
Kenneth Mars, actor, Young Frankenstein, The Producers, What's Up, Doc?, The Little Mermaid
Albert L. Marsh, metallurgist, co-inventor of nichrome
Benjamin F. Marsh, railroad czar, Civil War soldier, U.S. Representative
Frank Lewis Marsh, Seventh-day Adventist biologist, educator and young Earth creationist
Fred Marsh, MLB infielder 1949–56
George Marsh, decorated Civil War soldier
Benjamin H. Marshall, architect of Chicago hotels
Francis Marshall, brigadier general, World War I
George Marshall, film director, You Can't Cheat an Honest Man, Destry Rides Again, Houdini, How the West Was Won
Joan Marshall, actress
Jim Marshall, MLB first baseman 1958–62
Mike Marshall, outfielder for four MLB teams
Samuel S. Marshall, lawyer, 19th-century politician
William Marshall, singer, bandleader, husband of Ginger Rogers
June Martel, actress, Santa Fe Stampede, Forlorn River
Andra Martin, actress, The Thing That Couldn't Die, Up Periscope
Billy Martin, tennis player and coach
Cecil Martin, NFL fullback 1999–2003
Chuck Martin, football head coach, Miami of Ohio 
Cuonzo Martin, basketball head coach, University of California
James Stewart Martin, Civil War general, U.S. Representative
LaRue Martin, center for Loyola and Portland Trail Blazers, top pick of 1972 NBA draft
Lynn Morley Martin, U.S. Representative 1981–91, U.S. Secretary of Labor 1991–93
Marcella Martin, actress, Gone With the Wind, West of Tombstone
Nan Martin, actress, Goodbye, Columbus, The Other Side of the Mountain, The Drew Carey Show
Todd Martin, pro tennis player, U.S. Open and Australian Open finalist
Richard Martini, writer and director, Cannes Man
Carl Shipp Marvel, organic chemist
Dick Marx, jazz musician, ad jingle writer
Richard Marx, singer and songwriter
Russell Maryland, NFL defensive tackle, College Football Hall of Fame
Ron Masak, actor, Murder, She Wrote
Phil Masi, MLB catcher 1939–52
Bobby Joe Mason, basketball player for Bradley and Harlem Globetrotters
Noah M. Mason, politician (Republican), U.S. Representative 1937–63 (born in Wales)
Roswell B. Mason, mayor during Great Chicago Fire (born in New York)
William E. Mason, U.S. Representative, U.S. Senator (born in New York)
Michael Masser, songwriter, "Greatest Love of All"
Edgar Lee Masters, author and poet (born in Kansas)
Mary Elizabeth Mastrantonio, Oscar-nominated actress, Scarface, The Color of Money, The Abyss, The Perfect Storm, Limitless

Mat–Maz

Mary Matalin, presidential advisor, television commentator, editor, author
Carole Mathews, actress and radio personality
Milton W. Mathews, 19th-century publisher and politician
T.J. Mathews, MLB pitcher 1995–2002
Jake Matijevic, NASA engineer, developed Mars rovers
Marlee Matlin, Oscar-winning actress, Children of a Lesser God
Thad Matta, head basketball coach for Ohio State
Joel Aldrich Matteson, railroad executive, Governor of Illinois 1853–57 (born in New York)
Clyde Matthews, college football coach
Wid Matthews, baseball executive
Carl Mauck, center for four NFL teams, coach
John Mauer, college basketball coach
Bill Mauldin, Pulitzer Prize-winning cartoonist, Willie and Joe (born in New Mexico)
Jeff Mauro, television personality, Food Network
Jason Maxiell, NBA forward 2005–15
Dal Maxvill, MLB infielder, played in five World Series
Lucien Maxwell, hunter, owned ranch where Billy the Kid was killed
Philip Maxwell, 19th-century doctor, namesake of Chicago's Maxwell Street (born in Vermont)
William Keepers Maxwell, fiction editor of New Yorker 1936–75
Tiny Maxwell, football player, sportswriter, namesake of Maxwell Award
Donald May, actor, The Roaring 20s
Elaine May, actress, director, Oscar-nominated screenwriter, alumna of University of Chicago and Second City (born in Pennsylvania)
George S. May, businessman, golf promoter
John L. May, archbishop of St. Louis, Missouri 1980–92
William L. May, politician, first mayor of Springfield, Illinois
Marilyn Maye, singer (born in Kansas)
Oscar F. Mayer, founder of Oscar Mayer meat company (born in Germany)
Oscar G. Mayer Sr., chairman of Oscar Mayer 1955–65
Oscar G. Mayer Jr., chairman of Oscar Mayer 1966–2009
Benjamin Mayfield, cowboy, outlaw
Curtis Mayfield, soul, R&B and funk singer, songwriter, record producer
William Mayfield, cattleman, militia leader (born in Tennessee)
Jackie Mayo, outfielder for Philadelphia Phillies 1948–53
Margaret Mayo, playwright
Stanley Mazor, co-inventor of first microprocessor
Rob Mazurek, musician
Marin Mazzie, Tony Award-nominated actress

Mca–Mcd

Zach McAllister, pitcher for Cleveland Indians
James McAndrews, building commissioner, 9-term U.S. Representative (born in Rhode Island)
Brian McBride, soccer player, U.S. national team, MSL and English Premier League
Chi McBride, actor, Hawaii Five-0, I, Robot, The John Larroquette Show, Boston Public, Human Target
Steve McCall, drummer
Oliver McCall, boxer, WBC heavyweight champ 1994–95
Mercedes McCambridge, Oscar-winning actress, All the King's Men, Giant, Johnny Guitar, The Exorcist
Terrence McCann, wrestling gold medalist at 1960 Summer Olympics
Mel McCants, NBA player for Los Angeles Lakers 1989–90
Justin McCareins, NFL wide receiver 2001–08
Larry McCarren, center for Green Bay Packers 1973–84, commentator, Packers Hall of Fame
Alex McCarthy, MLB infielder 1910–17
Jenny McCarthy, model, actress, author, activist, Scream 3, Dirty Love, Witless Protection, The View
Johnny McCarthy, MLB first baseman 1934–48
Melissa McCarthy, Emmy-winning, Oscar-nominated actress, Mike & Molly, Bridesmaids, Identity Thief, Tammy
Peggy McCarthy, rowing bronze medalist, 1976 Olympics
Tim McCarthy, wounded Secret Service agent for Ronald Reagan
Constance McCashin, actress, Knots Landing
Ed McCaskey, chairman of Chicago Bears 1983–1999
George McCaskey, chairman of Chicago Bears
Michael McCaskey, chairman of Chicago Bears 1999–2011
Virginia Halas McCaskey, owner of Chicago Bears
Hazel A. McCaskrin, politician
Harry M. McCaskrin, politician
Sergio McClain, basketball player for Illinois
Gerald McClellan, middleweight boxing champion 1991–95
Kathleen McClellan, actress, 1988 Miss Illinois Teen USA
John Alexander McClernand, Civil War general, advisor to Presidents Lincoln and Grant, U.S. Representative
Robert McClory, U.S. Representative 1963–83
Alice Moore McComas, writer, editor, lecturer, social reformer 
Brooks McCormick, CEO of International Harvester
Mike McCormack, Hall of Fame NFL player, coach and executive
Cyrus Hall McCormick, businessman, inventor of McCormick Reaper (born in Virginia)
Edith Rockefeller McCormick, socialite, patron of opera and Brookfield Zoo
Harold Fowler McCormick, chairman of International Harvester Co., husband of Edith Rockefeller
Katharine McCormick, biologist, suffragist, and philanthropist (born in Michigan)
Robert R. McCormick, newspaper publisher and philanthropist
Ruth Hanna McCormick, suffragist, U.S. Representative 1929–31
Walter McCornack, first football coach for Northwestern
Joseph McCoy, cattle baron
LisaRaye McCoy, actress, All of Us, Single Ladies
Johnston McCulley, author, creator of Zorro
John T. McCutcheon, cartoonist
Jim McDermott, U.S. Representative of Washington
Glenn McDonald, member of 1976 NBA champion Boston Celtics
Ariel McDonald, basketball player; 2000 Israeli Basketball Premier League MVP
Robert A. McDonald, retired chairman and CEO of Procter & Gamble, U.S. Secretary of Veterans Affairs
John McDonough, president and CEO of Chicago Blackhawks
Frances McDormand, Oscar and Emmy-winning actress, Fargo, Blood Simple, Almost Famous, Moonrise Kingdom, Olive Kitteridge

Mce–Mcz

Ray McElroy, NFL defensive back 1995–2001
Frank McErlane, organized crime figure
Tatyana McFadden, wheelchair athlete, Paralympian, winner of Boston and Chicago marathons (born in Russia)
Chappie McFarland, MLB pitcher 1902–06
Packey McFarland, lightweight boxer
T. J. McFarland, relief pitcher for Arizona Diamondbacks
Bill McGee, MLB pitcher 1935–42
JaVale McGee, basketball player
Carla McGhee, basketball player, two NCAA championships, 1996 Olympic gold medalist
Tyler McGill, swimmer, gold medalist at 2012 London Olympics
Joe McGinnity, MLB player in Hall of Fame
William P. McGivern, novelist, books became films The Big Heat, Odds Against Tomorrow
Elizabeth McGovern, Oscar-nominated actress, Ragtime, Ordinary People, Once Upon a Time in America, Downton Abbey
Roxana McGowan, silent-film actress
Bob McGrath, television personality, Sesame Street
Lamar McGriggs, pro football player
Aaron McGruder, cartoonist, The Boondocks
Roger McGuinn, musician, The Byrds
Don McGuire, actor, Oscar-nominated screenwriter
Kathryn McGuire, silent-film actress, Sherlock Jr.
Jack McGurn, gangster with Chicago Outfit (born in Italy)
Donald McHenry, Ambassador to United Nations (born in Missouri)
William McHenry, 19th-century soldier and politician
Collin McHugh, pitcher for Houston Astros
Tim McIlrath, musician, Rise Against
Adam McKay, performer for Second City, screenwriter of Anchorman, director of The Big Short (born in Pennsylvania)
Lafe McKee, actor
William Parker McKee, president of Shimer College
Kevin McKenna, basketball player and coach
Raymond S. McKeough, U.S. Representative 1935–45
William B. McKinley, U.S. Representative 1905–21, Senator 1921–26
Denny McLain, pitcher, 31-game winner for 1968 World Series champion Detroit Tigers
John McLean, 19th-century U.S. Senator (born in North Carolina)
Frederic McLaughlin, first owner of Chicago Blackhawks
Claude McLin, saxophonist
Greg McMahon, college and NFL assistant coach
Jim McMahon, quarterback of Super Bowl XX champion Chicago Bears (born in New Jersey)
Sherrick McManis, NFL cornerback
James McManus, professional poker player, author
Marty McManus, MLB infielder 1920–34
Tom McManus, linebacker, Jacksonville Jaguars 1995–99
William Edward McManus, Roman Catholic bishop
Sherman McMaster, Wild West outlaw and lawman
Neysa McMein, illustrator and painter
Ernie McMillan, offensive tackle for St. Louis Cardinals 1961–74
Bob McMillen, player and coach, Arena Football League
Jim McMillen, guard for 1923 Illinois national champions, Chicago Bears
Rolla C. McMillen, lawyer, U.S. Representative 1944–51
Donovan McNabb, 6-time Pro Bowl quarterback for Philadelphia Eagles, Washington Redskins, TV commentator
Jerel McNeal, all-time leading scorer for Marquette basketball
Barbara McNair, singer, television personality and actress, Change of Habit, They Call Me Mister Tibbs!
Andrew McNally, founder of Rand McNally company in 1868 (born in Northern Ireland)
John McNaughton, film and TV director, Wild Things, Mad Dog and Glory, Homicide: Life on the Street
Don McNeill, radio personality
Marcus McNeill, offensive tackle for San Diego Chargers 2006–11
James McNerney, CEO of Boeing, 3M
John McNulta, Civil War general, U.S. Representative
William Slavens McNutt, screenwriter, Huckleberry Finn
James McParland, Chicago-based Pinkerton's detective, infiltrated Molly Maguires (born in Ireland)
Jimmy McPartland, big-band cornet player
Ryan McPartlin, actor, Chuck, Living With Fran
Samuel McRoberts, U.S. Attorney under Andrew Jackson, U.S. Senator
Margaret McWade, actress, Mr. Deeds Goes to Town
Doug McWeeny, MLB pitcher 1921–30

Md–Mh

George J. Mecherle, founder of State Farm Insurance
David Meckler (born 1987), ice hockey player
Joseph Medill, publisher, Mayor of Chicago 1871–73 (born in Canada)
Chris Medina, singer-songwriter, American Idol contestant
Mark Medoff, playwright, screenwriter, Children of a Lesser God
Patrick Meek, speed skater
Bill Mehlhorn, golfer, 1924 Western Open champion, 3rd in U.S. Open
Garry Meier, radio personality
Merrill C. Meigs, pilot, newspaper executive, Meigs Field named for him
Leo Melamed, CEO of Chicago Mercantile Exchange
Gene Melchiorre, basketball player, 1951 top NBA draft pick, banned for point-shaving scandal
Ski Melillo, MLB infielder 1926–37
Chuck Mellor, winner of 1925 Boston Marathon
Rich Melman, restaurateur
Lester Melrose, music producer
Walter Melrose, music producer
Bill Melton, MLB third baseman, sportscaster (born in Mississippi)
Rachel Melvin, actress, Dumb and Dumber To
Rashaan Melvin, NFL cornerback
John Willis Menard, first African-American elected to U.S. Congress, 1858
Pierre Menard, fur trader, Illinois' first lieutenant governor (born in Canada)
Carol Mendelsohn, TV executive, CSI and CSI:NY
Rashard Mendenhall, running back for Illinois and Super Bowl XLIII champion Pittsburgh Steelers
Alex Meneses, actress, model, Dr. Quinn, Medicine Woman, Everybody Loves Raymond
Sid Mercer, sportswriter
Joanna Merlin, casting director, actress
Charles Edward Merriam, political scientist, professor (born in Iowa)
Doris Merrick, actress, The Big Noise, The Counterfeiters
Ahmad Merritt, NFL wide receiver 2000–08
Aries Merritt, hurdler, 2012 London Olympics gold medalist
Bus Mertes, football coach, Kansas State, Drake
Robert Meschbach, soccer player
Laurie Metcalf, Emmy-winning actress, Roseanne, The Conners, JFK, Internal Affairs, Toy Story, Getting On
Ralph Metcalfe, sprinter, 100-meter silver medalist at 1936 Summer Olympics; politician (Democrat), U.S. Representative
Bert Metzger, football player
Dick Meyer, journalist, CBS News, BBC America and NPR
Joey Meyer, head basketball coach at DePaul 1984–97
John Meyer, pro football player and coach
Ray Meyer, Basketball Hall of Fame coach for DePaul
Russ Meyer, MLB pitcher 1946–59
Seth Meyers, comedian, actor, and television personality
Mezz Mezzrow, jazz musician

Mi–Mn

Patrick Michaels, climatologist, senior fellow at Cato Institute
M. Alfred Michaelson, banker, U.S. Representative (born in Norway)
Robert H. Michel, politician (Republican), U.S. Representative for 38 years, House Minority Leader 1981–95
Lucia Mida, golfer
Ray Middleton, actor, Hurricane Smith, Lady for a Night, 1776
Ludwig Mies van der Rohe, modernist architect (born in Prussia)
Richard W. Mies, admiral, head of U.S. Strategic Command 1998–2001
George Mikan, Hall of Fame basketball center, DePaul and 5-time NBA champion Minneapolis Lakers
Stan Mikita, 22-year player for Chicago Blackhawks, member of Hockey Hall of Fame (born in Canada)
Abner Mikva, judge, politician (Democrat), U.S. Representative, White House Counsel to President Bill Clinton
Darius Miles, forward for four NBA teams
Penelope Milford, Oscar-nominated actress, Coming Home
Bob Miller, pitched in MLB at 17
Bob Miller, broadcaster in Hockey Hall of Fame
Jack Miller, 12-year U.S. Senator of Iowa
Jesse Miller, musician
Otis L. Miller, MLB infielder 1927–32
Patrick Miller (born 1992), American basketball player in the Israeli Basketball Premier League
Red Miller, head coach of Denver Broncos 1977–80
Ron Miller, songwriter, "For Once in My Life"
Steve Miller, track coach, athletic director, Nike executive, PBA director
Terry Miller, NFL linebacker 1970–74
Ward Miller, MLB outfielder 1909–17
James Millhollin, character actor
Wally Millies, MLB catcher 1934–41
Robert Andrews Millikan, experimental physicist and Nobel laureate
Isaac Lawrence Milliken, blacksmith, alderman, Mayor of Chicago 1854–55 (born in Maine)
Donna Mills, actress, Knots Landing, Play Misty for Me
Douglas R. Mills, basketball player, coach and athletic director for University of Illinois
Phoebe Mills, gymnast, 1988 Olympic bronze medalist
Sherrill Milnes, opera singer
Bob Miner, co-founder of Oracle Corporation
Steve Miner, film and TV director
Vincente Minnelli, Oscar-winning film director, An American in Paris, Gigi, The Band Wagon, Lust for Life, The Bad and the Beautiful, Father of the Bride, Some Came Running
Minnie Miñoso, batted for White Sox in 1950s–1980s (born in Cuba)
Martha Minow, dean of Harvard Law School
Bob Mionske, attorney, Olympic and professional bicycle racer 
Chad Mirkin, Professor, Northwestern University
Pat Misch, MLB pitcher 2006–11
Jacquelyn Mitchard, author, The Deep End of the Ocean
Joan Mitchell, artist
John Mitchell, labor leader
John Francis Mitchell, President & COO of Motorola 1980–1995
Johnny Mitchell, NFL tight end 1992–96
Kel Mitchell, comedian and actor
Nicole Mitchell, flautist (born in New York)
Roscoe Mitchell, jazz saxophonist
Matt Mitrione, mixed martial artist

Mo–Mt

Tony Moeaki, NFL tight end
Joe Moeller, MLB pitcher and scout
Doug Moench, comic book writer, Batman
D. W. Moffett, actor, Switched at Birth, For Your Love, Friday Night Lights
Nazr Mohammed, center for eight NBA teams
Kid Mohler, baseball player, Pacific Coast League Hall of Fame
John Moisant, early 20th-century aviator
Bo Molenda, NFL player and coach
Jim Molinari, basketball head coach at Western Illinois, Bradley, Northern Illinois and Minnesota
David Molk, center for Philadelphia Eagles
Jeff Monken, football coach, Army
Harriet Monroe, poet
Meredith Monroe, actress, Dawson's Creek, Criminal Minds
Zach Monroe, pitcher for 1958 World Series champion Yankees
Eric Monte, creator of TV series Good Times
Karen Montgomery, actress, producer
Dwight L. Moody, evangelical minister, publisher, established Moody Bible Institute (born in Massachusetts)
William Vaughn Moody, dramatist and poet (born in Indiana)
Thomas Mooney, imprisoned labor leader
Allen F. Moore, U.S. Representative 1921–25
Annabelle Moore, dancer, silent film actress
Ben Moore (born 1995), basketball player in the Israeli Basketball Premier League
Charles R. Moore, actor
Christina Moore, actress, Hawthorne, Hyperion Bay, Hot Properties
Clayton Moore, actor, The Lone Ranger
Dayton Moore, baseball executive (born in Kansas)
D. J. Moore, NFL defensive back 2009–14
Dolores Moore, pro baseball player
Eleanor Moore, pro baseball player
Graham Moore, Oscar-winning screenwriter, The Imitation Game
Irving J. Moore, television director
Jesse Hale Moore, Civil War general, U.S. Representative
John Moore, NHL defenseman
John Moore, lieutenant governor 1842–46, Mexican–American War officer (born in England)
Margo Moore, actress, fashion model
Richard Moore, cinematographer, co-creator of Panavision
Stephen Moore, economic writer, policy analyst
Tim Moore, actor and comedian, Amos 'n' Andy
Emery Moorehead, tight end for Super Bowl XX champion Chicago Bears
Dick Moores, cartoonist
Pablo Morales, swimmer, 1984 and 1992 Olympic golds, Nebraska coach
Bugs Moran, gangster, rival of Al Capone
Jackie Moran, actor, The Adventures of Tom Sawyer, Buck Rogers
Jim Moran, automobile mogul, philanthropist
Lee Moran, actor, film director, screenwriter
Polly Moran, actress, Caught Short, Alice in Wonderland
Terry Moran, correspondent for ABC News
Tom Morello, guitarist for Rage Against the Machine
Anna Morgan, drama teacher (born in New York)
Cindy Morgan, actress, Caddyshack, Tron
Ed Morgan, infielder for Cleveland Indians 1928–33
Helen Morgan, singer, portrayed in biopic The Helen Morgan Story
Read Morgan, actor, The Deputy
Trevor Morgan, actor, The Sixth Sense, Jurassic Park III, The Patriot
Big Bill Morganfield, blues singer and guitarist
George Moriarty, MLB player, manager and umpire
Buckner Stith Morris, Mayor of Chicago 1838–39 (born in Kentucky)
Johnny Morris, receiver for Chicago Bears, sportscaster (born in California)
Lamorne Morris, actor, New Girl
Max Morris, basketball and football All-American for Northwestern
Allie Morrison, freestyle wrestler, 1928 Olympic gold medalist (born in Iowa)
David Morrison, astrophysicist
James L. D. Morrison, Mexican War officer, U.S. Representative 1856–57
Jennifer Morrison, actress, model, House, How I Met Your Mother, Star Trek, Once Upon a Time
Karen Morrison-Comstock, 1974 Miss USA
William Ralls Morrison, Civil War officer, U.S. Representative
Byron Morrow, actor, Executive Suite
Karen Morrow, singer
William Morrow, screenwriter 
Lee Mortimer, journalist and author
Amy Morton, actress, Up in the Air, Chicago P.D.
Charles Morton, actor
Jelly Roll Morton, jazz pianist (born in Louisiana)
Joy Morton, founder of Morton Salt Company and Morton Arboretum
Lorraine H. Morton, first African-American mayor of Evanston
John Mosca, restaurateur in Louisiana
Porter Moser, basketball coach, Illinois State, Loyola
Mark Moses, actor, Desperate Housewives, Grand, Mad Men
Senta Moses, actress, General Hospital, Running the Halls, Home Alone
Peter Moskos, assistant professor at John Jay College of Criminal Justice
Stewart Moss, actor, writer, and director
Burton C. Mossman, cattleman and lawman
Johnny Mostil, outfielder for White Sox, 2-time AL stolen-base leader
Willard Motley, columnist and author
Ben Roy Mottelson, physicist, 1975 Nobel Prize
Markos Moulitsas, founder of liberal blog Daily Kos, columnist
Samuel W. Moulton, lawyer, U.S. Representative (born in Massachusetts)
Anson Mount, actor, Hell on Wheels, Non-Stop
Edgar Ansel Mowrer, foreign correspondent and author
Paul Scott Mowrer, war correspondent and editor
John Moyer, lineman for arena football's Chicago Rush
Mr. T, actor, Rocky III, The A-Team

Mu–Mz

Jerry Muckensturm, linebacker for Chicago Bears 1976–83
Jessie Mueller, singer and actress, Tony Award winner
Earl Muetterties, inorganic chemist
Jabir Herbert Muhammad, Nation of Islam official, manager of Muhammad Ali
Gavin Muir, actor
John Mulaney, stand-up comedian
Mark Mulder, pitcher for Oakland Athletics and St. Louis Cardinals
Clarence E. Mulford, creator of Hopalong Cassidy
David Mulford, U.S. Ambassador to India 2004–09
Martin Mull, actor, Fernwood 2 Night, Mr. Mom, Clue, Serial, Roseanne, Dads
Vern Mullen, NFL halfback 1923–27
Bill Mulliken, swimming gold medalist, 1960 Olympics
George Mundelein, cardinal and Archbishop of Chicago (born in New York)
Madman Muntz, car-stereo pioneer
Edgar Munzel, baseball writer
Ira Murchison, sprinter, 1956 Summer Olympics relay gold
Ben Murphy, actor, Alias Smith and Jones, Winds of War (born in Arkansas)
Charles Murphy, owner of Chicago Cubs 1906–13
David Lee Murphy, country music artist
Dick Murphy, mayor of San Diego 2000–05
John Murphy, swimmer, gold medalist at 1972 Summer Olympics
John Benjamin Murphy, surgeon and innovator (born in Wisconsin)
Kelly Murphy, volleyball player
Thomas Joseph Murphy, archbishop of Seattle, Washington 1990–97
Bill Murray, comedian and Oscar-nominated actor, Saturday Night Live, the Ghostbusters movies, Stripes, Tootsie, Caddyshack, Groundhog Day, Scrooged, Lost in Translation, St. Vincent
Brian Doyle-Murray, actor, voice artist, Saturday Night Live, Marvelous Misadventures of Flapjack, The Razor's Edge, Wayne's World, Cabin Boy, The Middle
Elizabeth Murray, artist
Joel Murray, actor, Dharma & Greg, Love & War, Grand, Mad Men
John Murray, music teacher, founder of Naperville, Illinois
Brent Musburger, sportscaster, 1960s Chicago sportswriter (born in Oregon)
John Musker, animation director, Aladdin, Hercules, The Princess and the Frog
George Musso, Hall of Fame lineman for Chicago Bears
Max Mutchnick, TV producer, creator of Will & Grace
Riccardo Muti, symphony conductor (born in Italy)
Mike Myers, MLB pitcher 1995–2007
Don Myrick, saxophonist for Earth, Wind & Fire, Phil Collins

N
Na–Nn

John Naber, swimmer, winner of five Olympic medals
Bill Nack, author and journalist
Steven R. Nagel, astronaut
Jack Nagle, basketball coach for Marquette 1953–58
Ajay Naidu, actor, Office Space, LateLine
Suzy Nakamura, actress, The 40-Year-Old Virgin, Dr. Ken
Duke Nalon, auto racer in Motorsports Hall of Fame of America
Bryan Namoff, pro soccer player
Albinus Nance, Governor of Nebraska 1879–1883
Ray Nance, trumpeter
Joseph Naper, shipbuilder, first village president of Naperville
Robert Nardelli, CEO, Chrysler, Home Depot (born in Pennsylvania)
Charles W. Nash, automobile entrepreneur, created Nash Motors
Heather Nauert, news anchor for Fox News Channel
Tom Neal, actor, Detour, Crime, Inc.
Long John Nebel, radio personality
Oscar Neebe, convicted Haymarket affair anarchist (born in New York)
Carrie Neely, four-time U.S. Open tennis doubles champion
Cal Neeman, MLB catcher 1957–63
John G. Neihardt, author and historian
A.L. Neiman, co-founder of Neiman Marcus
Bernie Neis, MLB player 1920–27
Baby Face Nelson, bank robber and murderer in the 1930s
Battling Nelson, boxer, lightweight champion 1905–06 (born in Denmark)
John Nelson, swimmer, 1964 and 1968 Olympic medalist
Karl Nelson, lineman for Super Bowl XXI champion New York Giants
Michael J. Nelson, comedian and writer, Mystery Science Theater 3000
Wayne Nelson, musician from classic rock's Little River Band
Eliot Ness, treasury agent, chief investigator of Prohibition Bureau, subject of film and TV series The Untouchables
Dawn Clark Netsch, state senator, comptroller, gubernatorial candidate
Lois Nettleton, 1948 Miss Illinois, Emmy-winning actress, The Twilight Zone, Come Fly with Me, Period of Adjustment, Butterfly
Jerry Neudecker, baseball umpire
Harry Neumann, cinematographer
Allan Nevins, historian and 1933 Pulitzer Prize-winning biographer
Arthur S. Nevins, U.S. Army general, friend of Dwight Eisenhower
Walter C. Newberry, Civil War officer, Chicago postmaster, U.S. Representative (born in New York)
New Colony Six, rock band from Chicago
Francis K. Newcomer, general, Panama Canal Zone governor 1948–52
Bob Newhart, Emmy and Grammy-winning comedian, actor, The Bob Newhart Show, Newhart, Catch-22, In & Out, The Librarian, Elf
Joe Newton, cross country coach, 28 state championships
Alberta Nichols, songwriter
Marisol Nichols, actress, Riverdale, Resurrection Blvd., 24, Blind Justice
Mike Nichols, Oscar and Tony-winning film and stage director, alumnus of University of Chicago and Second City (born in Russia)
Nichelle Nichols, actress, Star Trek
Danell Nicholson, heavyweight boxer
Seth Barnes Nicholson, astronomer
Carl Nicks, NBA player 1980–83
John George Nicolay, secretary to Abe Lincoln (born in Germany)
Arthur Nielsen, founder of Nielsen Company, television ratings
Rick Nielsen, musician, Cheap Trick
Audrey Niffenegger, author, The Time Traveler's Wife
Alexa Nikolas, actress, Zoey 101, Hidden Hills
Rob Ninkovich, linebacker and defensive end for New England Patriots
Ray Nitschke, Hall of Fame linebacker for Green Bay Packers, five-time NFL champion
Frank Nitti, gangster, associate of Al Capone (born in Italy)
Jack Nitzsche, Oscar-winning songwriter, "Up Where We Belong"
Agnes Nixon, creator of All My Children
Ogonna Nnamani, volleyball player, two-time Olympian

No–Nz

Natalia Nogulich, actress, Star Trek: The Next Generation
Christopher Nolan, director, Batman Begins, The Dark Knight (born in England)
Jonathan Nolan, screenwriter, The Dark Knight Rises, Interstellar (born in England)
George Nolfi, screenwriter, The Bourne Ultimatum, Ocean's Twelve
Ken Nordine, voice-over artist (born in Iowa)
Nelson Norgren, four-sport athlete, 34-year University of Chicago coach
Ken Norman, player for three NBA teams
Bruce Norris, owner of NHL's Detroit Red Wings 1952–82
James D. Norris, chairman of Chicago Blackhawks, member of Hockey Hall of Fame
James E. Norris, miller, part-owner of Chicago Stadium and NHL teams (born in Canada)
Frank Norris, novelist
Lou North, MLB pitcher 1913–24
Cliff Norton, actor
Ken Norton, heavyweight boxer and actor, Mandingo
Ken Norton Jr., NFL linebacker and coach
Red Norvo, xylophone and vibraphone musician
Kim Novak, Golden Globe-winning actress, Vertigo, Picnic, Pal Joey, Bell, Book and Candle, Kiss Me, Stupid
Larry Novak, musical director at Mister Kelly's
Robert Novak, syndicated columnist, TV personality, author, conservative political commentator
Steve Novak, forward for Oklahoma City Thunder
Jay Novello, actor
Brent Novoselsky, tight end for Minnesota Vikings 1988–94
Christopher Nowinski, author, former WWE professional wrestler
Ted Nugent, rock musician
Mike Nussbaum, actor, Men in Black, Things Change
Russell Nype, Broadway actor and Tony Award winner
David Nyvall, theologian, first president of North Park University (born in Sweden)

O
Oa–Ok

Barack Obama, 44th President of the United States; former US Senator from Illinois (2004–2008) (born in Hawaii)
Michelle Obama, First Lady of the United States, wife of Barack Obama
Dean O'Banion, organized crime figure
Ken Oberkfell, MLB infielder 1977–92
Arch Oboler, playwright, radio personality, film director
Ed O'Bradovich, defensive end for 1963 NFL champion Chicago Bears
Hugh O'Brian, actor, The Life and Legend of Wyatt Earp, Ten Little Indians, Come Fly With Me, The Shootist
Chris O'Brien, pro football pioneer, owner of Chicago Cardinals
George M. O'Brien, U.S. Representative 1973–86
Thomas J. O'Brien, 24-year U.S. Representative
Jack O'Callahan, hockey player for Chicago Blackhawks and in 1980 "Miracle on Ice" game
Bob Ociepka, basketball coach
Mike O'Connell, NHL player and executive
Tommy O'Connell, quarterback, Cleveland Browns, 1957 NFL title game
Colleen O'Connor, ice dancer, 3-time U.S. champion, Olympic bronze
Donald O'Connor, dancer, singer, actor, Singin' in the Rain, There's No Business Like Show Business, Francis, Ragtime
Kevin J. O'Connor, actor, Color of Night, The Mummy, There Will Be Blood
Leslie O'Connor, baseball executive
Tim O'Connor, actor, Peyton Place, Buck Rogers in the 25th Century
Tommy O'Connor, gangster (born in Ireland)
Anita O'Day, singer
Hank O'Day, Baseball Hall of Fame umpire
Rasmea Odeh, convicted of immigration fraud, for concealing her arrest, conviction, and imprisonment for fatal terrorist bombing
Bill Odenkirk, comedy writer, actor, producer, Mr. Show, The Simpsons
Bob Odenkirk, actor, comedian, writer, director, Better Call Saul, Breaking Bad, Nebraska, Mr. Show, Fargo
Chris O'Donnell, actor, NCIS: Los Angeles, Scent of a Woman, Batman Forever, Batman & Robin
Jake Odorizzi, pitcher for Minnesota Twins
Matt O'Dwyer, NFL offensive lineman 1995–2004
Joe Oeschger, MLB pitcher 1915–24
Bob O'Farrell, catcher for three MLB teams, 1926 MVP and World Series champion, manager
Nick Offerman, actor, comedian, Parks and Recreation, The Lego Movie, We're the Millers, Fargo
William Butler Ogden, politician (Democrat), businessman, first Mayor of Chicago (born in New York)
Joseph Ogle, Revolutionary War soldier, established state's first Methodist church (born in Maryland)
Richard James Oglesby, politician (Republican), Civil War officer, U.S. Senator, 3-time Governor of Illinois (born in Kentucky)
Richard B. Ogilvie, Governor of Illinois 1969–73
Gail O'Grady, actress, American Dreams, NYPD Blue, Hellcats
David Ogrin, pro golfer
Barratt O'Hara, lieutenant governor, U.S. Representative 1949–69
Janice O'Hara, pro baseball player
Edward J. O'Hare, lawyer, associate of Al Capone, father of war hero Butch O'Hare (for whom O'Hare Airport was named)
Michael O'Hare, actor, best known from Babylon 5
Don Ohl, 5-time All-Star for three NBA teams
Don Ohlmeyer, Emmy and Peabody Award-winning television producer, Monday Night Football, Saturday Night Live
Jahlil Okafor, basketball player for Duke and Philadelphia 76ers, third pick of 2015 NBA draft
Georgia O'Keeffe, artist, Art Institute of Chicago student (born in Wisconsin)

Ol–Oz

Douglas R. Oberhelman, CEO of Caterpillar Inc.
Ed Olczyk, player for six NHL teams, coach, TV commentator
Claes Oldenburg, sculptor
Brian Oldfield, shot putter
Jawann Oldham, center for eight NBA teams
Catherine O'Leary, said to be indirectly responsible for Great Chicago Fire
Charley O'Leary, oldest MLB player (58) ever to bat
Matt O'Leary, actor
John M. Olin, owner of 1974 Kentucky Derby winner Cannonade
Ken Olin, actor, director, producer, Thirtysomething, Brothers & Sisters
Gene Oliver, catcher for five MLB teams
Guy Oliver, silent-film actor
King Oliver, jazz musician (born in Louisiana)
Martha Capps Oliver, poet, hymnwriter	
Gertrude Olmstead, silent-film actress
James Olson, actor, The Andromeda Strain, Rachel, Rachel, Ragtime
Francis O'Neill, Chicago chief of police 1901–05 (born in Ireland)
Kyle Onstott, author, Mandingo
Jerry Orbach, film, TV and Tony-winning stage actor, Law & Order, Prince of the City, Dirty Dancing, Beauty and the Beast
Dick Orkin, radio personality
Suze Orman, author, financial advisor, television commentator
Red Ormsby, Major League Baseball umpire 1923–41
Carey Orr, cartoonist
David Orr, alderman, Cook County clerk, briefly Mayor of Chicago
Johnny Orr, basketball coach, University of Michigan and Iowa State
Warren H. Orr, judge (born in Missouri)
Zak Orth, actor, Revolution
Kid Ory, musician and bandleader (born in Louisiana)
Harold Osborn, athlete, gold medalist in decathlon and high jump at 1924 Summer Olympics
Dan Osinski, MLB pitcher 1962–70
Wally Osterkorn, pro basketball player
Fritz Ostermueller, MLB pitcher 1934–48
Johnny Ostrowski, MLB player for Cubs and White Sox
Jim O'Toole, MLB pitcher 1958–67
Dave Otto, MLB player, sportscaster
Diana Oughton, student activist, member of The Weathermen
Antoine Ouilmette, early settler, Wilmette named for him (born in Canada)
Michael Ovitz, co-founder of Creative Artists Agency, president of Walt Disney Company 1995–97
Ruth Bryan Owen, first female in Florida elected to U.S. Congress; ambassador to Denmark and Iceland
Brick Owens, MLB umpire 1908–37 (born in Wisconsin)
Joseph W. Ozbourn, decorated World War II soldier
Marite Ozers, 1963 Miss USA (born in Latvia)

P
Pa–Pd

Geraldine Page, Oscar-winning actress, The Trip to Bountiful, Hondo, Sweet Bird of Youth (born in Missouri)
Harlan Page, two-sport star for University of Chicago, head coach of Butler basketball, Indiana football
Kimberly Page, professional wrestling personality
Jean Paige, silent-film actress
Eleazar A. Paine, lawyer, controversial Civil War officer (born in Ohio)
Norman C. Paine, football coach, Baylor, Arkansas and Iowa State
Curtis Painter, NFL quarterback 2009–14
Ho-Sung Pak, actor, martial artist, action choreographer
Max Palevsky, philanthropist, computer technology pioneer
William S. Paley, broadcasting pioneer, chief executive of CBS
Donn Pall, MLB pitcher 1988–98
Ashley Palmer, actress, singer, Paranormal Activity
Bee Palmer, singer, "Please Don't Talk About Me When I'm Gone"
Bertha Palmer, philanthropist (born in Kentucky)
Betsy Palmer, actress and TV personality, Mister Roberts, The Tin Star, I've Got a Secret, Friday the 13th (born in Indiana)
John M. Palmer, politician (Democrat, Republican, Free Soil), Civil War general, U.S. Senator 1891–97, Governor of Illinois 1869–73 (born in Kentucky)
John McAuley Palmer, World War II general
Keke Palmer, actress, singer, Madea's Family Reunion, Joyful Noise
Peter Palmer, singer, athlete, actor, Li'l Abner (born in Wisconsin)
Phoebe Palmer, evangelist and author (born in New York)
Potter Palmer, land developer, Palmer House founder (born in New York)
Shirley Palmer, actress
Danielle Panabaker, actress, Shark, Empire Falls, Friday the 13th, The Flash (born in Georgia)
Kay Panabaker, actress, Summerland, Phil of the Future (born in Texas)
Norman Panama, screenwriter, director, White Christmas, Road to Utopia, Mr. Blandings Builds His Dream House
Ken Panfil, NFL lineman 1956–62
James Pankow, musician, a founding member of rock band Chicago
John Pankow, actor, To Live and Die in L.A., A Stranger Among Us, Morning Glory, Episodes
Chuck Panozzo, bass player for rock band Styx
John Panozzo, drummer for rock band Styx
Al Papai, MLB pitcher 1948–55
Billy Papke, middleweight boxing champion, Hall of Fame
Erik Pappas, MLB catcher
Walter Parazaider, musician with band Chicago
Jimmy Pardo, stand-up comedian, actor
Sara Paretsky, crime novelist
Jannero Pargo, guard for six NBA teams
Tiny Parham, pianist and bandleader (born in Canada)
Jane Park, LPGA golfer
Anthony Parker, guard for four NBA teams; 2004 Israeli Basketball Premier League MVP; current general manager of NBA G League's Lakeland Magic.
Candace Parker, two-time NCAA champion, two-time Olympic gold medalist, forward for Los Angeles Sparks
Eric Parker, wide receiver for San Diego Chargers 2002–07
Francis W. Parker, education reformer (born in New Hampshire)
Jabari Parker, forward for Milwaukee Bucks, second player selected in the 2014 NBA draft
Salty Parker, MLB player, coach, manager
Sonny Parker, guard for Golden State Warriors 1976–82
Wes Parker, first baseman for Los Angeles Dodgers 1964–72
Larry Parks, Oscar-nominated actor, The Jolson Story, Down to Earth, Jolson Sings Again, The Swordsman
Ben Parr, journalist, author, venture capitalist 
Vernon Parrington, historian, 1928 Pulitzer Prize
Terell Parks (born 1991), professional basketball player in the Israeli Basketball Premier League
Albert Parsons, editor, anarchist executed after Haymarket affair (born in Alabama)
Claude V. Parsons, educator, U.S. Representative 1930–41
Louella Parsons, syndicated newspaper columnist
Lucy Parsons, anarchist and labor organizer (born in Texas)
Cecil A. Partee, president of state senate (born in Arkansas)
Ed Paschke, artist
Tony Pashos, NFL offensive tackle 2003–13
Ravi Patel, actor, Grandfathered
Don Patinkin (1922–1995)), Israeli-American economist, and President of the Hebrew University of Jerusalem
Mandy Patinkin, actor and singer, The Princess Bride, Dick Tracy, Ragtime, Yentl, Chicago Hope, Homeland
Sheldon Patinkin, theater director for Columbia College, Second City
Danica Patrick, auto racing driver, best finish of any woman in history of Daytona 500 and Indianapolis 500 (born in Wisconsin)
David Patrick, Olympic hurdler
Deval Patrick, governor of Massachusetts 2007–15
Laurdine Patrick, saxophonist
Leonard Patrick, organized crime figure (born in England)
Stan Patrick, pro basketball player
Alexandra Patsavas, TV/film music supervisor, Grey's Anatomy, Supernatural, The Hunger Games: Catching Fire
Alicia Patterson, editor and publisher, founder of Newsday
Cissy Patterson, editor and publisher, countess
Don Patterson, producer, animator, director, The Smurfs, Dumbo, Pinocchio, Fantasia
Joseph Medill Patterson, editor, publisher, New York Daily News founder
Pat Patterson, MLB player, New York Giants 1921
Marty Pattin, pitcher for five MLB teams
Spencer Patton, relief pitcher for Cubs
Art Paul, graphic artist for Playboy 1953–83; designer of bunny logo
Josh Paul, catcher for four MLB teams
Gene Paulette, MLB infielder 1914–20
Henry Paulson, financier, 2006–09 U.S. Secretary of the Treasury
Pawnee Bill, Wild West showman
John Paxson, three-time NBA champion, team executive for Chicago Bulls (born in Ohio)
Melanie Paxson, actress
Tom Paxton, folk musician and singer-songwriter
Ethel L. Payne, journalist, activist
John B. Payne, Secretary of Interior 1920–21 (born in West Virginia)
Sally Payne, actress
William Morton Payne, educator, writer (born in Massachusetts)
Christian Payton, actor, The Temptations
Sean Payton, head coach for New Orleans Saints (born in California)
Jarrett Payton, pro football player, radio personality
Walter Payton, Hall of Fame running back for Super Bowl XX champion Chicago Bears (born in Mississippi)

Pe–Pg

Walter C. Peacock, jeweler, Lincoln Park Gun Club founder
Barry Pearson, NFL wide receiver 1972–76
Drew Pearson, syndicated newspaper columnist
Paul Martin Pearson, professor, governor of Virgin Islands
Preston Pearson, running back for three NFL teams
Todd Peat, NFL offensive lineman 1987–93
Donald C. Peattie, author and botanist
Elia W. Peattie, journalist and naturalist (born in Michigan)
John Mason Peck, Baptist minister and author (born in Connecticut)
Ferdinand Peck, philanthropist, financier of Auditorium Building, Chicago
George Peek, economist
Westbrook Pegler, journalist, 1941 Pulitzer Prize (born in Minnesota)
Chris Pelekoudas, MLB umpire
Rob Pelinka, general manager of Los Angeles Lakers, player for three Final Four basketball teams
Clara Peller, commercial actress
Michael Peña, actor, World Trade Center, Crash, Shooter, End of Watch, American Hustle, The Martian
D. A. Pennebaker, documentary filmmaker, Dont Look Back, The War Room, Unlocking the Cage
Jack Perconte, infielder for four MLB teams
Chuck Percy, president of Bell & Howell Corporation, U.S. Senator (Republican) of Illinois for 20 years (born in Florida)
George Periolat, silent-film actor
Marlin Perkins, host of television's Wild Kingdom, 18-year director of Lincoln Park Zoo (born in Missouri)
Walter Perkins, drummer
Edythe Perlick, pro baseball player
Bill Perry, cartoonist
Felton Perry, actor, Magnum Force, RoboCop
Jeff Perry, actor, Nash Bridges, Grey's Anatomy, Scandal
Rudy Perz, advertising executive, creator of Pillsbury Doughboy
Jim Peterik, singer-songwriter with bands The Ides of March and Survivor, co-wrote "Eye of the Tiger"
Elizabeth Peters, mystery novelist
Joan Peters, journalist and author
Ted Petersen, offensive lineman for two-time Super Bowl champion Pittsburgh Steelers
William Petersen, actor, Gil Grissom on CSI: Crime Scene Investigation, Manhunter, To Live and Die in L.A., The Rat Pack
Dan Peterson, pro basketball coach
Drew Peterson, police officer, convicted murderer
Fritz Peterson, pitcher for New York Yankees and Cleveland Indians
Pehr August Peterson, Rockford, Illinois industrialist and philanthropist
Peter George Peterson, CEO of Lehman Bros., Bell & Howell, 1972–73 U.S. Secretary of Commerce (born in Nebraska)
Bernice Petkere, songwriter
Robert Petkoff, stage actor (born in California)
Lloyd Pettit, hockey sportscaster
George Petty, pinup artist (born in Louisiana)
Dave Peyton, songwriter and musician
Jeff Pfeffer, MLB pitcher 1911–24
Wally Pfister, Oscar-winning cinematographer
Father Michael Pfleger, controversial Roman Catholic priest
Lee Pfund, pitcher for Brooklyn Dodgers
Randy Pfund, head coach for Los Angeles Lakers 1992–94, general manager for Miami Heat

Ph–Pn
 

Liz Phair, singer and songwriter (born in Connecticut)
Roger Phegley, guard for five NBA teams
Art Phelan, MLB player for Cincinnati Reds and Chicago Cubs
Mary Philbin, silent-film actress, Phantom of the Opera
Andy Phillip, Hall of Fame basketball player for Illinois
Busy Philipps, actress, Dawson's Creek, Freaks and Geeks, ER
Emo Philips, entertainer and comedian
Irna Phillips, creator of Guiding Light and As the World Turns
John Calhoun Phillips, Governor of Arizona 1929–31
Kyra Phillips, television journalist
Wally Phillips, radio personality (born in Ohio)
William Phipps, actor, Cinderella (born in Indiana)
Brian Piccolo, running back for Chicago Bears, subject of Brian's Song (born in Massachusetts)
Bob Pickens, Olympic wrestler and Bears offensive lineman
Ollie Pickering, first batter in MLB American League history
William Pickering, 19th-century governor of Washington (born in England)
Pat Pieper, public-address announcer at Wrigley Field for 59 years
Billy Pierce, pitcher, scout, broadcaster for Chicago White Sox, 7-time All-Star (born in Michigan)
George Pierce, MLB player 1912–17
Walter M. Pierce, 17th Governor of Oregon
Jimmy Piersall, baseball player and Chicago sportscaster, subject of Fear Strikes Out (born in Connecticut)
Geoff Pierson, actor, Unhappily Ever After, 24, Dexter
Pete Pihos, decorated soldier, 6-time Pro Bowl player for NFL's Philadelphia Eagles 1947–55 (born in Florida)
Janet Pilgrim, model, three-time Playboy centerfold
Andy Pilney, football coach, Tulane 1954–61
Steve Pink, writer, director, Accepted, Hot Tub Time Machine
Allan Pinkerton, detective, founder of Pinkerton's agency
Tonya Pinkins, Tony Award-winning actress, Jelly's Last Jam, Fading Gigolo, All My Children
Maria Pinto, fashion designer
Wally Pipp, first baseman for Detroit Tigers and 1923 World Series champion New York Yankees
Scottie Pippen, forward for Chicago Bulls six-time champions, member of Hall of Fame (born in Arkansas)
Louis Piquett, lawyer of John Dillinger
Pauline Pirok, pro baseball player
Skip Pitlock, MLB pitcher 1970–75
Arthur Pitney, inventor of the postage meter, co-founder of Pitney Bowes
Jeremy Piven, Emmy-winning actor, Entourage, Mr. Selfridge, Very Bad Things, Two for the Money, Old School
Plain White T's, rock band from Chicago
Polly Platt, film producer, screenwriter
James E. Plew, aviation pioneer
Pete Ploszek, actor, Teen Wolf, the Teenage Mutant Ninja Turtles films
Ed Plumb, composer for Disney films, Fantasia, Bambi

Po–Pz

John Podesta, White House Chief of Staff under Bill Clinton
Amy Poehler, comedian, actress, Second City, Saturday Night Live, Parks and Recreation (born in Massachusetts)
Angelo Poffo, professional wrestler
D. A. Points, professional golfer
Ben Pollack, big-band era bandleader
Fritz Pollard, first African-American head coach in NFL and Pro Football Hall of Famer
Dan Ponce, radio-TV journalist, singer with Straight No Chaser
Phil Ponce, Chicago television personality
Irving Kane Pond, architect (born in Michigan)
Cappie Pondexter, pro basketball player, 2007 MVP of WNBA Finals (born in California)
Ernest Poole, Pulitzer Prize-winning novelist
William Frederick Poole, first Chicago Public Library librarian, designed Newberry Library (born in Massachusetts)
Carmelita Pope, actress
Nathaniel Pope, politician and advocate of statehood (born in Kentucky)
John Porter, U.S. Representative 1980–2001
H.V. Porter, coach, coined term "March Madness"
Kevin Porter, guard for three NBA teams, 4-time league assist leader
Glenn Poshard, U.S. Representative, Southern Illinois University president
Michael Posner, attorney, human rights advocate, Assistant Secretary of State under Barack Obama
C. W. Post, breakfast cereal mogul
Marjorie Merriweather Post, founder of General Foods
Philip S. Post, Civil War general, U.S. Representative (born in New York)
Lou Pote, MLB pitcher 1999–2004
Nels Potter, pitcher for six MLB teams
Leah Poulos-Mueller, speed skater, 1976 and 1980 Olympic medalist
Jack Powell, MLB pitcher, won 245 games
John Wesley Powell, explorer, Civil War officer, Illinois Wesleyan professor (born in New York)
Maud Powell, violinist
Paul Powell, controversial politician
Jenny Powers, actress and 2000 Miss Illinois
John A. "Shorty" Powers, NASA official, voice of Mercury Control
A. George Pradel, mayor of Naperville 1995–2015
Deborah Pratt, actress, writer
Toni Preckwinkle, teacher, president of Cook County Board
Tom Preissing, NHL defenseman
Mike Prendergast, MLB pitcher 1914–19
Patrick Prendergast, assassin of Chicago mayor, 1893 (born in Ireland)
Keith Preston, writer
Louis Price, singer with Temptations, Drifters
Melvin Price, 33-year U.S. Representative
Julian Priester, trombonist
George W. Prince, 8-term U.S. Representative
Tom Prince, MLB catcher 1987–2003
Joe Principe, musician, member of band Rise Against
John Prine, singer-songwriter
Bret Prinz, MLB pitcher 2001–07
Mike Prior, defensive back for Super Bowl XXXI champion Green Bay Packers
A.N. Pritzker, lawyer and philanthropist (born in Russia)
Donald Pritzker, co-founder and president of Hyatt hotels
Jay Pritzker, co-founder, Hyatt Hotel chain
J.B. Pritzker, principal owner of Hyatt, philanthropist, politician
Penny Pritzker, U.S. Secretary of Commerce
Robert Pritzker, president of Marmon Group
Cory Provus, baseball broadcaster
William Proxmire, 42-year U.S. Senator of Wisconsin
Richard Pryor, Emmy and Grammy Award-winning comedian and actor, The Mack, Silver Streak, Stir Crazy, The Toy, Superman III
Roman Pucinski, politician (Democrat), U.S. Representative 1959–73
Kirby Puckett, Hall of Fame center fielder for two-time World Series champion Minnesota Twins
Tom Pukstys, six-time U.S. javelin champion
George M. Pullman, industrialist, designer of Pullman sleeping car (born in New York)
Edward Mills Purcell, winner of Nobel Prize in Physics
David Purcey, MLB pitcher 2008–13
Todd Purdum, national editor and political correspondent for Vanity Fair
Ken Purdy, automotive writer
Tim Purpura, baseball executive
C. C. Pyle, sports promoter
Mike Pyle, center for Chicago Bears 1961–69 (born in Iowa)

Q

Mike Quade, coach and manager for Chicago Cubs
John Qualen, actor, Casablanca, The Grapes of Wrath, The Searchers
William Quarter, first Bishop of Chicago (born in Ireland)
Joel Quenneville, coach of 3-time NHL champion Chicago Blackhawks (born in Canada)
Jeff Query, wide receiver for Green Bay Packers and Cincinnati Bengals
Smiley Quick, pro golfer
Allie Quigley, pro basketball player
Mike Quigley, politician (Democrat), U.S. Representative
Elaine Quijano, television journalist
Frank Quilici, player, coach and manager for Minnesota Twins
Peter Quillin, middleweight boxer
Jack Quinlan, sportscaster
Maeve Quinlan, tennis player and actress, The Bold and the Beautiful, South of Nowhere
Michael R. Quinlan, chairman of Loyola and McDonald's
Aidan Quinn, actor, Legends of the Fall, Benny and Joon, Michael Collins, Avalon, Mary Shelley's Frankenstein, Elementary
Declan Quinn, cinematographer
Jeff Quinn, football coach
Louis Quinn, actor, 77 Sunset Strip
Pat Quinn, politician (Democrat), attorney, state treasurer, Governor of Illinois 2009–14
Adolfo "Shabba Doo" Quiñones, actor, dancer, choreographer

R
Ra–Rd

Charles Radbourn, Hall of Fame baseball pitcher (born in New York)
Doug Rader, infielder, manager of Texas Rangers, Chicago White Sox, California Angels
Phil Radford, environmental leader, Greenpeace executive director
Bill Radovich, football player and actor
Sondra Radvanovsky, opera soprano
Zoe Rae, silent-film actress
Robert O. Ragland, film score composer
Tom Railsback, politician (Republican), 8-term U.S. Representative
Henry Thomas Rainey, politician (Democrat), U.S. Representative 1903–34, Speaker of the House under FDR
John W. Rainey, U.S. Representative 1918–23
Mamie Rallins, hurdler, coach, 2-time Olympian
Buck Ram, songwriter, "Only You", "The Great Pretender"
Sendhil Ramamurthy, actor, Heroes, Beauty & the Beast, Covert Affairs
Harold Ramis, actor, director, writer SCTV, Ghostbusters, Caddyshack, Stripes, Groundhog Day, National Lampoon's Vacation
Charles H. Ramsey, police commissioner of Philadelphia, 1998–2007 police chief of Washington, D.C.
Edwin Ramsey, U.S. Army officer, guerrilla leader during the World War II Japanese occupation of the Philippines
Lorene Ramsey, softball, basketball Hall of Famer (born in Missouri)
Ray Ramsey, defensive back for Chicago Cardinals
Bill Rancic, television personality, The Apprentice, Giuliana and Bill
William Rand, founder of Skokie-based Rand McNally (born in Massachusetts)
Martha Randall, swimmer, bronze medalist in 1964 Summer Olympics
Rebel Randall, actress, radio personality
Tony Randazzo, MLB umpire
Betsy Randle, actress, Boy Meets World
Brian Randle (born 1985), NBA coach and former Israeli Basketball Premier League player
Antwaan Randle El, wide receiver for Super Bowl XL champion Pittsburgh Steelers
Kerri Randles, actress
Isabel Randolph, actress
Thomas E. G. Ransom, Civil War general, Ransom, Illinois named for him (born in Vermont)
Frederic Raphael, Oscar-winning screenwriter, Darling, Two for the Road
Adam Rapp, novelist, playwright, screenwriter, musician, film director
Anthony Rapp, actor, singer, A Beautiful Mind, Rent, Dazed and Confused, Road Trip
Wayne Rasmussen, defensive back for Detroit Lions 1964–72
John Ratcliffe, Republican Congressman from Texas
George Ratkovicz, pro basketball player
Heather Rattray, actress, As the World Turns, Guiding Light
Green Berry Raum, brigadier general, chief of Internal Revenue Service 1876–83
Bruce Rauner, Governor of Illinois
John Aaron Rawlins, Civil War officer, U.S. Secretary of War
Lou Rawls, soul, jazz and blues singer and actor, winner of three Grammy Awards
Charles Ray, actor, producer, director
Hugh Ray, football official, Pro Football Hall of Fame
James Earl Ray, carried out April 1968 assassination of Martin Luther King Jr.
Joie Ray, 3-time Olympian, runner in Track Hall of Fame
Lyman Beecher Ray, lieutenant governor 1889–93 (born in Vermont)
Gene Rayburn, television personality, Match Game
Benjamin Wright Raymond, third Mayor of Chicago (born in New York)
Bugs Raymond, MLB pitcher 1904–11
Robin Raymond, actress, There's No Business Like Show Business
Ray Rayner, Chicago television personality (born in New York)

Re–Rh

Jack Reagan, father of President Ronald Reagan
Nancy Reagan, actress, 1981–89 First Lady of the United States (born in New York)
Neil Reagan, radio-TV executive, older brother of Ronald Reagan
Nelle Wilson Reagan, mother of Ronald Reagan
Ronald Reagan, actor, politician (Republican), Governor of California and 40th President of the United States (born in Tampico, Illinois)
Billy Reay, won 516 games as Chicago Blackhawks coach (born in Canada)
Eugene Record, singer, The Chi-Lites
William Reddick, businessman, philanthropist, politician
Jheri Redding, hair care entrepreneur
Quinn Redeker, actor, screenwriter, The Young and the Restless, Days of Our Lives, Dan Raven, The Deer Hunter
Courtney Reed, actress
Dizzy Reed, musician, Guns N' Roses
James F. Reed, organizer of Donner Party (born in Ireland)
Jeff Reed, MLB catcher 1984–2000
Jimmy Reed, guitarist in Blues Hall of Fame (born in Mississippi)
John Shedd Reed, president of Atchison, Topeka and Santa Fe Railway
Robert Reed, actor, Mike Brady on The Brady Bunch
Rondi Reed, stage actress, singer and performer
Tommy Rees, quarterback for Notre Dame 2010–13
George Reeves, actor, Superman (born in Iowa)
Tim Regan, pro soccer player
Henry Regnery, publisher, founder of Regnery Publishing
Wally Rehg, MLB player 1912–19
Kathy Reichs, crime writer, forensic anthropologist, academic
Charlotte Thompson Reid, singer, politician (Republican), U.S. Representative 1963–71
Frank R. Reid, attorney in court-martial of General Billy Mitchell, U.S. Representative 1923–35
Joe Reiff, basketball All-American for Northwestern
John Reilly, actor, Passions, Sunset Beach, Iron Man
John C. Reilly, actor, Talladega Nights, Step Brothers, Chicago, Gangs of New York, The Perfect Storm, Wreck-It Ralph
Ed Reimers, television announcer
Johan Reinhard, explorer
Bill Reinhardt, musician and bandleader
Haley Reinhart, singer, American Idol
Jerry Reinsdorf, owner of Chicago White Sox and Chicago Bulls (born in New York)
Todd Reirden, NHL player and coach
Bryan Rekar, pitcher for three MLB teams
Pat Renella, actor, Bullitt
Marcus Reno, Civil War officer, served with Gen. Custer in Battle of the Little Bighorn
Nancy Reno, beach volleyball player
Pug Rentner, College Football Hall of Fame player for Northwestern
REO Speedwagon, rock band from Champaign
Ken Retzer, MLB catcher 1961–64
Paul Reuschel, pitcher for Chicago Cubs 1975–79
Rick Reuschel, pitcher for five Major League teams, 3-time All-Star
Katherine Reutter, speed skater, 2011 world champion, medalist in 2010 Vancouver Olympics
Frank Reynolds, Chicago and ABC newscaster (born in Indiana)
John Reynolds, judge, U.S. Representative, Governor of Illinois 1830–34 (born in Pennsylvania)
Marcellas Reynolds, actor, fashion stylist, entertainment reporter, TV host
Virginia Richmond Reynolds, artist
Wellington J. Reynolds, artist
La Julia Rhea, opera singer
John Rheinecker, pitcher for Texas Rangers 2006–07
Shonda Rhimes, television producer, creator, Scandal, Grey's Anatomy
Betty Jane Rhodes, singer, actress, Sweater Girl, The Fleet's In
Jennifer Rhodes, actress, Charmed, Heathers

Ri–Rn

Paul Ricca, mobster with Chicago Outfit
John Blake Rice, actor, producer, Mayor of Chicago 1865–69 (born in Maryland)
Craig Rice, mystery novelist and screenwriter
Simeon Rice, defensive lineman for Super Bowl XXXVII champion Tampa Bay Buccaneers
Wallace Rice, poet, writer, designer of Flag of Chicago (born in Canada)
Bob Richards, pole vaulter, gold medalist 1952 Helsinki Olympics and 1956 Melbourne Olympics
Carol Richards, singer, radio and television performer
Denise Richards, actress, The World Is Not Enough, Denise Richards: It's Complicated
Lee Richardson, actor, Prizzi's Honor, Prince of the City
Quentin Richardson, player for five NBA teams
Salli Richardson, actress, Eureka, Gargoyles, Family Law
Sy Richardson, actor, Pushing Daisies
William Alexander Richardson, governor of Nebraska territory, U.S. Senator of Illinois (born in Kentucky)
Lionel Richie, multiple Grammy Award-winning singer (born in Alabama)
Julius B. Richmond, U.S. Surgeon General 1977–81
Steve Richmond, defenseman for four NHL teams
Andy Richter, actor, comedian, Late Night with Conan O'Brien, Madagascar films & cartoons
Joyce Ricketts, pro baseball player
Laura Ricketts, lawyer, co-owner of Chicago Cubs (born in Nebraska)
Tom Ricketts, banker, owner and chairman of Cubs (born in Nebraska)
Todd Ricketts, businessman, co-owner of Cubs (born in Nebraska)
Hyman G. Rickover, admiral, attended Marshall High School in Chicago (born in Poland)
Lucille Ricksen, silent film actress
John Ridgely, actor, The Big Sleep, Destination Tokyo
John Riegger, golfer
Marty Riessen, tennis player, US Open, French Open, Wimbledon doubles and mixed doubles champion
Dorothy Comiskey Rigney, owner of Chicago White Sox 1956–58
Johnny Rigney, White Sox pitcher and general manager
Boots Riley, rapper, producer 
Ida Morey Riley, founder of Columbia College Chicago
Jack Riley, Northwestern player in College Football Hall of Fame, silver medalist 1932 Olympic wrestling
Patrick William Riordan, archbishop of San Francisco 1884–1914 (born in Canada)
Minnie Riperton, singer, "Lovin' You", mother of Maya Rudolph
Wally Ris, swimmer, two-time NCAA champion, two 1948 Olympic golds
Rise Against, rock band from Chicago
Bill Risley, pitcher for three MLB teams
Laura J. Rittenhouse, activist, writer, poet, manager, clubwoman 	
Doc Rivers, NBA point guard, head coach of Los Angeles Clippers
Mike Rizzo, general manager of Washington Nationals
Rick Rizzs, baseball broadcaster

Ro–Rt

Tanner Roark, pitcher for Washington Nationals
Jason Robards, Oscar-winning actor, A Thousand Clowns, All the President's Men, Julia, Once Upon a Time in the West, Parenthood
Jason Robards Sr., actor (born in Michigan)
Kevin Roberson, MLB outfielder 1993–96
Gale Robbins, singer, model and actress, Calamity Jane, The Barkleys of Broadway, Three Little Words
Leona Roberts, actress, Gone With the Wind
Robin Roberts, Hall of Fame starting pitcher primarily for Philadelphia Phillies, won 286 games
Sue Roberts, golfer
Nan C. Robertson, journalist, 1983 Pulitzer Prize
Angela Robinson, director, screenwriter, producer, True Blood, The L Word, Hung
Arthur B. Robinson, biochemist, politician
Betty Robinson, sprinter, gold medalist at 1928 and 1936 Olympics
Craig Robinson, actor, stand-up comedian, The Office, Last Comic Standing, Hot Tub Time Machine, This Is the End
Craig Robinson, basketball coach, brother of Michelle Obama
Flynn Robinson, guard for four NBA teams
Frank M. Robinson, author
John McCracken Robinson, lawyer, U.S. Senator of Illinois 1830–41 (born in Kentucky)
Kelsey Robinson, indoor volleyball player
Marian Shields Robinson, mother-in-law of President Barack Obama
Will Robinson, basketball coach for Illinois State, first African-American head coach at Division I school (born in North Carolina)
Bill Robinzine, DePaul and pro basketball player
Lelia P. Roby (1848-1910), American philanthropist; founder, Ladies of the Grand Army of the Republic
Mason Rocca, Princeton and pro basketball player
James Roche, CEO and chairman of General Motors 1965–71
John A. Roche, president of elevated railway, Mayor of Chicago 1887–89 (born in New York)
Sharon Percy Rockefeller, former first lady of West Virginia, Washington, D.C. television executive
Knute Rockne, College Football Hall of Fame head coach for Notre Dame Fighting Irish (born in Norway)
George Lincoln Rockwell, founder of American Nazi Party
Robert Rockwell, actor, Our Miss Brooks, The Man from Blackhawk, Lassie, The Red Menace
Leo Rodak, boxer
Steve Rodby, musician
William A. Rodenberg, 10-term U.S. Representative
Mark Rodenhauser, NFL center 1987–99
Jimmy Rodgers, coach, Minnesota Timberwolves, Boston Celtics
Dorothy Howell Rodham, mother of Hillary Clinton
Hugh Rodham, lawyer, brother of Hillary Clinton
Freddy Rodríguez, actor, Six Feet Under, Ugly Betty, Planet Terror
Francisco Rodriguez, boxer (born in Mexico)
Gina Rodriguez, actress, Jane the Virgin, The Bold and the Beautiful
Richard Roeper, columnist, film critic, co-host of At the Movies
Billy Rogell, MLB infielder 1925–40
Annette Rogers, sprinter, relay gold medalist, 1932 and 1936 Olympics
Carl Rogers, prominent psychologist
Desiree Rogers, CEO of Johnson Publishing (born in Louisiana)
Jimmy Rogers, blues musician (born in Mississippi)
John W. Rogers Jr., founder of Ariel Capital, head of Barack Obama inauguration committee
Michael S. Rogers, admiral, director of National Security Agency
Len Rohde, lineman for San Francisco 49ers 1960–74
Mark Romanek, Grammy-winning music video and film director, One Hour Photo, Never Let Me Go
Christina Romer, chair of the Council of Economic Advisers under President Barack Obama
Miles Park Romney, builder, Mormon leader, great-grandfather of Mitt Romney
Tony Romo, quarterback, Eastern Illinois and Dallas Cowboys (born in California)
Michael Rooker, actor, Cliffhanger, Days of Thunder, Guardians of the Galaxy (born in Alabama)
John E. Rooney, CEO of U.S. Cellular
Sean Rooney, volleyball player, NCAA champion at Pepperdine, gold medalist at 2008 Beijing Olympics
John Root, architect
Adam Rosales, MLB infielder
Derrick Rose, guard for New York Knicks, first player selected in 2008 NBA draft, 2008–09 NBA Rookie of the Year
Fred Rose, songwriter, Country Music Hall of Fame (born in Indiana)
Helen Rose, Oscar-winning costume designer
Roger Rose, actor, voice actor, former VH1 VJ, Monsters and Mysteries in America, The Tick, Quack Pack, Happy Feet
Timothy M. Rose, actor, puppeteer, Return of the Jedi, The Dark Crystal
Wesley Rose, music producer
Johnny Roselli, organized crime figure (born in Italy)
Jacky Rosen, U.S. Senator from Nevada
Clarke Rosenberg (born 1993), American-Israeli basketball player
Milt Rosenberg, professor, radio host
Tom Rosenberg, film producer, Million Dollar Baby, The Hurricane, Runaway Bride, Underworld series
Frank Rosenthal, organized crime figure
Julius Rosenwald, philanthropist, president of Sears, Roebuck & Company, founder of Museum of Science and Industry
Lessing J. Rosenwald, president of Sears
Peter Roskam, politician (Republican), U.S. Representative
Arthur Ross, Oscar-nominated screenwriter, Brubaker, The Great Race
Barney Ross, boxing world champion (born in New York)
Charlotte Ross, actress, NYPD Blue, Beggars and Choosers
Leonard Fulton Ross, Civil War general
Lewis W. Ross, lawyer, Mexican–American War officer, U.S. Representative (born in New York)
Ossian M. Ross, farmer, War of 1812 officer, founder of Lewistown and Havana (born in New York)
Ricco Ross, actor, Westbeach
Dan Rostenkowski, politician (Democrat), U.S. Representative 1959–95, chairman of House Ways and Means Committee
Marv Rotblatt, pitcher for Chicago White Sox 1949–52
Matt Roth, NFL defensive end 2005–11
Veronica Roth, author of Divergent series (born in New York)
Claude Rothgeb, football coach for Colorado State, Rice
Larry Rothschild, pitching coach for New York Yankees
John L. Rotz, Hall of Fame jockey
Tom Rouen, punter for six NFL teams
Pleasant Rowland, founder of American Girl
Cynthia Rowley, fashion designer
Rosey Rowswell, baseball broadcaster
Bill Roy, U.S. Representative in Kansas 1971–75
Willy Roy, player and coach, Soccer Hall of Fame (born in Germany)
Stan Royer, infielder for St. Louis Cardinals 1961–64
Mike Royko, Pulitzer Prize-winning newspaper columnist
Andrew Rozdilsky Jr., ballpark mascot Andy the Clown

Ru–Rz

Aaron Ruben, television producer and director, The Andy Griffith Show
Jack Ruby, killer of Lee Harvey Oswald
J. Craig Ruby, basketball coach, Illinois 1922–36 (born in Iowa)
Dave Rudabaugh, Wild West outlaw
Ken Rudolph, catcher for four MLB teams
Kirk Rueter, pitcher for San Francisco Giants 1996–2005
Rudy Ruettiger, motivational speaker, Notre Dame football player, Rudy
Red Ruffing, Hall of Fame pitcher for New York Yankees
Sarah Ruhl, playwright
Irene Ruhnke, pro baseball player
Joe Ruklick, Northwestern and NBA player
Julian Sidney Rumsey, shipping mogul, Mayor of Chicago 1861–62 (born in New York)
Donald Rumsfeld, politician (Republican), Secretary of Defense, White House Chief of Staff, U.S. Representative
Bobby Rush, politician (Democrat), U.S. Representative
Otis Rush, blues musician
William A. Rusher, lawyer, columnist, publisher of National Review from 1957 to 1988
Marion Rushing, 4-sport athlete for Southern Illinois, NFL linebacker
Cazzie Russell, member of College Basketball Hall of Fame, player for 1970 NBA champion New York Knicks
Chuck Russell, director, The Mask, Eraser
Gail Russell, actress, The Uninvited, Angel and the Badman, Wake of the Red Witch
Lewis Russell, actor, The Lost Weekend
Lillian Russell, early 20th-century singer and actress (born in Iowa)
Mary Doria Russell, novelist
Pee Wee Russell, jazz clarinetist
Marty Russo, U.S. Representative 1975–93
William Russo, jazz musician and composer
Edward B. Rust Jr., CEO of State Farm insurance
Joe Rutgens, defensive tackle for Washington Redskins 1961–69
Ann Rutledge, friend of Abraham Lincoln (born in Kentucky)
Dan Ryan Jr., businessman, president of Cook County Board of Commissioners
George Ryan, Governor of Illinois 1999–2003
Jack Ryan, banker, teacher, Senate candidate vs. Barack Obama
Jeri Ryan, actress, Star Trek: Voyager, Boston Public, 1989 Miss Illinois
Rex Ryan, head coach for NFL's New York Jets, Buffalo Bills
Rob Ryan, defensive coordinator for four NFL tams
Robert Ryan, actor, The Wild Bunch, The Dirty Dozen, The Set-Up, Crossfire, Bad Day at Black Rock, The Longest Day
Shawn Ryan, television producer and writer, The Shield, The Unit, Angel
Gary Rydstrom, film sound designer, seven-time Academy Award winner
Frank Rydzewski, pro and Notre Dame lineman
Michael Rye, radio and voice actor
Jules Rykovich, co-MVP of 1947 Rose Bowl for Illinois (born in Croatia)
Bob Ryland, tennis player and coach
Herbert Ryman, animator, helped design Disneyland
Lou Rymkus, NFL tackle, coach for Houston Oilers
Miro Rys, professional soccer player (born in Czechoslovakia)
Marc Rzepczynski, MLB relief pitcher

S
Sa–Sb

Lou Saban, head coach of NFL's Buffalo Bills, Denver Broncos and New England Patriots
Adolph J. Sabath, politician (Democrat), U.S. Representative 1907–52 (born in Czechoslovakia)
Bret Saberhagen, pitcher for Kansas City Royals, 1985 Cy Young Award winner and World Series MVP
Lenny Sachs, head coach of Loyola basketball 1923–42
Jonathan Sadowski, actor, Live Free or Die Hard, Young & Hungry
Craig Sager, sportscaster
Bernard Sahlins, founder of Second City comedy club
Susan Saint James, Emmy-winning actress, McMillan & Wife, Kate & Allie, Outlaw Blues, Love at First Bite (born in California)
Pat Sajak, television personality, host of Wheel of Fortune
Sol Saks, screenwriter, creator of Bewitched (botn in New York)
Sheri Salata, president of Oprah Winfrey Network (born in Georgia)
Chic Sale, actor
Virginia Sale, actress
Edward S. Salomon, Civil War general, Chicago alderman, Governor of Washington 1870–72 (born in Denmark)
Jerome Sally, NFL tackle 1982–88
Waldo Salt, Oscar-winning screenwriter, Midnight Cowboy, Serpico
Carmen Salvino, bowler, charter member PBA Hall of Fame
Jeff Salzenstein (born 1973), tennis player
Tony Sam, stand-up comedian
Bill Sampen, MLB pitcher 1990–94
Don Samuelson, Governor of Idaho 1967–71
Ulises Armand Sanabria, television pioneer
Kiele Sanchez, actress, Married to the Kellys, Related, Lost
Ryne Sandberg, Hall of Fame infielder for Chicago Cubs, manager of Philadelphia Phillies 2013–15 (born in Washington)
Carl Sandburg, iconic Pulitzer Prize-winning poet and journalist
Hugh Sanders, actor
Scott Sanderson, MLB pitcher 1978–96 (born in Michigan)
Tommy Sands, singer, actor, first husband of Nancy Sinatra
Jenny Sanford, banker, first lady of South Carolina 2003–10
George E. Sangmeister, U.S. Representative, Will County district attorney
Evelyn Sanguinetti, lieutenant governor (born in Florida)
David Santee, figure skater, two-time Olympian
Rick Santelli, editor for the CNBC Business News network
Ron Santo, Hall of Fame third baseman for Cubs and White Sox, radio sportscaster (born in Washington)
Horatio Sanz, comedian, Saturday Night Live
Abe Saperstein, owner-coach, Harlem Globetrotters (born in England)
Lewis Hastings Sarett, chemist and inventor
Peter Sarsgaard, actor, An Education, Boys Don't Cry, Shattered Glass, Kinsey, Orphan, Blue Jasmine
Louis Satterfield, musician with Earth, Wind & Fire
Doris E. Saunders, librarian and professor
Red Saunders, drummer (born in Tennessee)
Warner Saunders, Chicago television newscaster
Dan Savage, writer, creator of Savage Love
Fred Savage, actor, director, The Wonder Years, The Princess Bride, Austin Powers in Goldmember
Randy Savage, professional wrestler
Ted Savage, outfielder for eight MLB teams
Matt Savoie, Olympic figure skater
Eugene Sawyer, Mayor of Chicago 1987–89 (born in Alabama)
Ken Saydak, blues musician
Gale Sayers, Hall of Fame running back for Chicago Bears, athletic director at Southern Illinois in 1970s (born in Kansas)
Morgan Saylor, actress, Homeland
George D. Sax, innovative banker

Sc–Sg
 

Joseph Scalise, organized crime figure
J. Young Scammon, early Chicago settler, banker (born in Maine)
Richard Schaal, actor, first husband of Valerie Harper
Wendy Schaal, actress, American Dad!, It's a Living, Fantasy Island
George Schaefer, TV and stage director
Germany Schaefer, MLB infielder 1901–18
Johnny Schaive, infielder for Washington Senators 1958–63
Jan Schakowsky, politician (Democrat), U.S. Representative since 1999
Ray Schalk, Hall of Fame catcher for Chicago White Sox
Dan Schatzeder, pitcher for nine MLB teams
Molly Schaus, 2-time Olympic hockey silver medalist (born in New Jersey)
Paul Scheuring, writer-director, Prison Break
Sharm Scheuerman, basketball player and head coach, Iowa
Jon Scheyer, basketball player and assistant coach, Duke
Claire Schillace, pro baseball player
Phyllis Schlafly, conservative activist, author
Fred Schmidt, 1964 Olympic swimming gold medalist
Harv Schmidt, basketball player and coach at Illinois
Karl Patterson Schmidt, herpetologist, zoology curator at Chicago Natural History Museum
Lanny D. Schmidt, chemist, inventor, author, professor
Aaron Schock, U.S. Representative, resigned from office 2015 (born in Minnesota)
Red Schoendienst, Hall of Fame second baseman for St. Louis Cardinals and Milwaukee Braves
Russ Schoene, pro basketball player
Dana Schoenfield, swimmer, 1972 Olympic silver medalist
Admiral Schofield, small forward for the Washington Wizards (born in England)
Dick Schofield, infielder for California Angels and Toronto Blue Jays
Ducky Schofield, infielder for several Major League teams
Michael Schofield, lineman for Denver Broncos
O'Brien Schofield, NFL linebacker (born in South Carolina)
John Schommer, basketball Hall of Famer, University of Chicago
Jessy Schram, actress, Falling Skies
Avery Schreiber, actor and comedian
Dorothy Schroeder, pro baseball player
Leonard W. Schuetz, U.S. Representative 1931–44 (born in Germany)
Fred Schulte, MLB outfielder 1927–37
Bill Schulz, panelist, producer, Fox's Red Eye w/ Greg Gutfeld
Don Schulze, MLB pitcher 1983–89
Joe Schultz, MLB player and manager
William Schutz, psychologist
Fred Schmidt, swimmer, gold and bronze medalist in 1964 Summer Olympics, Navy SEAL
Tony Schumacher, drag racer, 7-time NHRA champ
Joseph Schwantner, composer
Jim Schwantz, NFL linebacker 1992–98
Ed Schwartz, radio personality
Frederick Schwatka, U.S. Army lieutenant, noted explorer of northern Canada and Alaska
Gloria Schweigerdt, professional baseball player
Rusty Schwimmer, actress, Twister, The Perfect Storm
Ignaz Schwinn, founder of bicycle company (born in Germany)
Thomas N. Scortia, novel adapted as The Towering Inferno
Bud Scott, jazz musician (born in Louisiana)
Rick Scott, Governor of Florida
Stefanie Scott, actress, singer, A.N.T. Farm, Wreck-It Ralph
Stuart Scott, ESPN sportscaster
Walter Dill Scott, psychologist, president of Northwestern 1920–39
Gil Scott-Heron, jazz musician, Grammy Lifetime Achievement Award
Nancy Scranton, golfer
Edward Willis Scripps, newspaper publisher, founder of E.W. Scripps Company
Ellen Browning Scripps, journalist and philanthropist (born in England)
James E. Scripps, newspaper publisher (born in England)
Al Sears, saxophonist
Richard Warren Sears, businessman, co-founder of Sears, Roebuck and Company (born in Minnesota)
Amy Sedaris, actress and comedian, Strangers with Candy
E.C. Segar, creator of Popeye
Harry Gordon Selfridge, department store pioneer, founder of Selfridges (born in Wisconsin)
Rose Buckingham Selfridge, Chicago heiress
Kevin Seitzer, All-Star third baseman, Atlanta Braves hitting coach
William Nicholas Selig, motion picture pioneer
David Seltzer, director and screenwriter, Punchline, Shining Through, Bird on a Wire, The Omen
James Semple, U.S. Senator 1843–47 (born in Kentucky)
Tony Semple, NFL lineman 1994–2002
Bill Senn, NFL running back 1926–34
Mary Servoss, actress, In This Our Life
Mary Foot Seymour, law reporter, businesswoman, school founder, journalist

Sh

Shabbona, 19th-century Native American leader
Shadows of Knight, rock band from Mt. Prospect
Dirk Shafer, actor and Playgirl model
Tom Shales, Pulitzer Prize-winning TV critic
John Shalikashvili, U.S. Army general, Chairman Joint Chiefs of Staff
Ashton C. Shallenberger, Governor of Nebraska 1909–11, six-term U.S. Representative
Janet Shamlian, NBC news correspondent
Mike Shanahan, head coach of NFL's Los Angeles Raiders, Denver Broncos, Washington Redskins
Garry Shandling, comedian and actor, The Larry Sanders Show
Howie Shanks, MLB outfielder 1912–25
Michael Shannon, actor, Boardwalk Empire, Take Shelter, Revolutionary Road, Man of Steel (born in Kentucky)
Samuel H. Shapiro, lieutenant governor and 1968–69 Governor of Illinois
Shannon Sharpe, NFL tight end 1990–2003, three-time Super Bowl champion, Pro Football Hall of Fame, TV analyst
Sterling Sharpe, wide receiver, College Football Hall of Fame, Green Bay Packers 1988–94, TV analyst
Frank Shaughnessy, college football player and coach, pro baseball player and executive
Bernard Shaw, television journalist for CNN
Guy L. Shaw, U.S. Representative 1921–25
Howard Van Doren Shaw, architect
Stan Shaw, actor, The Boys in Company C, The Great Santini, Daylight, Snake Eyes, Harlem Nights
William Shawn, editor of The New Yorker from 1952 to 1987
Larry Shay, songwriter, "When You're Smiling"
John T. Shayne, milliner
Aaron Shea, NFL tight end 2000–06
John G. Shedd, president of Marshall Field & Company, philanthropist, founder of Shedd Aquarium (born in New Hampshire)
Vincent Sheean, war correspondent and author
Arthur Sheekman, screenwriter, Duck Soup, Some Came Running
Earl Sheely, 1920s first baseman for White Sox
Fulton J. Sheen, Roman Catholic Archbishop and television personality
Bernard J. Sheil, Roman Catholic Archbishop, founder of CYO
Edward Sheldon, playwright
Sidney Sheldon, author, screenwriter, producer, I Dream of Jeannie, Hart to Hart, Annie Get Your Gun, The Other Side of Midnight
Derek Shelton, hitting coach for Tampa Bay Rays
Sam Shepard, actor, director, Pulitzer Prize-winning playwright, Fool for Love, The Right Stuff, The Pelican Brief, Baby Boom, The Notebook
Jean Shepherd, radio personality, writer and narrator of A Christmas Story
Sherri Shepherd, comedian, actress, co-host of The View
Jack Sheridan, MLB umpire 1890–1914
Philip Sheridan, Civil War general, led Great Chicago Fire reconstruction, ran Washington Park Race Track (born in New York)
Allan Sherman, comedy writer, song parodist
Alson Sherman, fire chief, Mayor of Chicago 1844–45 (born in Vermont)
Francis Cornwall Sherman, 3-term Mayor of Chicago (born in Connecticut)
Francis Trowbridge Sherman, Civil War general (born in Connecticut)
Gene Sherman, Pulitzer Prize-winning journalist
Lawrence Yates Sherman, lieutenant governor, U.S. Senator (born in Ohio)
Brian Sherwin, art critic, curator, writer
Brad Sherwood, comedian, Whose Line Is It Anyway?
James Shields, Irish-born senator of Illinois, Minnesota and Missouri
Ren Shields, songwriter, "In the Good Old Summer Time"
John Shimkus, politician (Republican), U.S. Representative since 1997
Katherine Shindle, actress and 1998 Miss America
Kiernan Shipka, actress, Sally Draper on Mad Men
George E. Shipley, U.S. Representative 1959–79
William L. Shirer, war correspondent, historian
Bernie Shively, All-American guard for Illinois, coach and athletic director at Kentucky
Twila Shively, pro baseball player
William Shockley (1910–1989), Nobel Prize-winning physicist, co-inventor of the transistor
Vaughn Shoemaker, cartoonist
Lee Sholem, film director, The Redhead from Wyoming, Tarzan and the Slave Girl, Superman and the Mole Men
Bobby Short, cabaret singer, pianist and recording artist
Ed Short, executive with Chicago White Sox 1950–70
Luke Short, novelist
Rick Short, MLB player and scout
Brian Shouse, MLB pitcher 1993–2009
Bobby Shriver, activist, writer and California politician
Maria Shriver, television journalist, author, 2003–11 first lady of California
David Shulkin, U.S. Secretary of Veterans Affairs
Richard B. Shull, actor, The Fortune, Unfaithfully Yours
George P. Shultz, U.S. Secretary of Labor 1969–70, Treasury 1972–74, Secretary of State 1982–89, Chicago professor (born in New York)
Iman Shumpert, guard for Cleveland Cavaliers
John Shurna, Northwestern basketball all-time leading scorer

Si–Sk

Billy Sianis, founder of Billy Goat Tavern (born in Greece)
Drew Sidora, actress, That's So Raven
Thomas Siebel, technology executive, philanthropist
Don Siegel, film director, Dirty Harry, Charley Varrick, The Shootist, Invasion of the Body Snatchers, Coogan's Bluff
Jeremy Siegel, professor of finance at the Wharton School of the University of Pennsylvania
Casey Siemaszko, actor, Breaking In, Of Mice and Men, NYPD Blue, Back to the Future parts 1 and 2
Nina Siemaszko, actress, The West Wing, The American President, License to Drive, Sinatra, Mystery Woman
Eric Sievers, tight end for San Diego Chargers 1981–90
Jack Sikma, 7-time NBA All-Star center for Seattle SuperSonics
Paul Sills, original director of The Second City
Joe Silver, actor, You Light Up My Life, Deathtrap
Nate Silver, quarterback of first Notre Dame undefeated team, 1903
Shel Silverstein, cartoonist, screenwriter, author of children's books
Ken Silvestri, MLB catcher and coach
Bobby Simmons, guard for five NBA teams
Jade Simmons, concert pianist, 2000 Miss America runner-up
Liesel Pritzker Simmons, actress, heiress
Marty Simmons, basketball coach, Evansville University
Tony Simmons, NFL wide receiver 1998–2002
Bryan W. Simon, film and stage director
Paul Simon, politician (Democrat), U.S. Senator 1985–97, presidential candidate (born in Oregon)
Roger Simon, journalist, columnist for Politico
Scott Simon, program host for National Public Radio
Sheila Simon, law professor, Illinois lieutenant governor
S. Sylvan Simon, film director and producer, I Love Trouble, The Fuller Brush Man, Born Yesterday
Carole Simpson, radio and TV journalist
Diane Simpson-Bundy, two-time Olympian in rhythmic gymnastics
Edna Oakes Simpson, U.S. Representative 1959–61, widow of Sid Simpson
Sid Simpson, transportation executive, U.S. Representative 1943–58
Will Simpson, Olympic gold medalist in equestrian
Mike Singletary, Hall of Fame linebacker for Chicago Bears (born in Texas)
James Singleton, power forward for the Guangdong Southern Tigers
Gary Sinise, Golden Globe and Emmy Award-winning actor, director, musician, CSI: NY, Forrest Gump, Apollo 13
Charlie Siringo, Chicago-based Pinkerton's detective (born in Texas)
Bob Sirott, radio and TV personality
Joseph J. Sisco, CIA officer and diplomat
Gene Siskel, film critic, co-host of Siskel & Ebert
George Skakel, industrialist, father of Ethel Kennedy
William V. Skall, Oscar-winning cinematographer
Bob Skelton, swimmer, 1924 Olympic gold medalist
Roe Skidmore, 1-for-1 for Cubs in lone MLB at-bat
Jeffrey Skilling, former president of Enron, convicted of multiple federal felony charges
Tom Skilling, meteorologist for WGN News
Cornelia Otis Skinner, actress and author
Frank Skinner, Oscar-nominated composer
Jane Skinner, TV journalist, wife of NFL Commissioner Roger Goodell
Samuel K. Skinner, U.S. Secretary of Transportation and White House Chief of Staff for President George H. W. Bush
Lou Skizas, MLB outfielder 1956–59
Tony Skoronski, jockey
Bill "Moose" Skowron, MLB first baseman, five World Series championships with New York Yankees
Victor Skrebneski, photographer

Sl–Sn

Jack Slade, gunfighter, Pony Express rider
Duke Slater, NFL tackle and College Football Hall of Famer
John Slater, physicist
James M. Slattery, U.S. Senate appointee
Martha Sleeper, actress
Grace Slick, lead singer of Jefferson Airplane, Jefferson Starship, composer of "White Rabbit"
Blake Sloan, NHL winger 1999–2004
Jerry Sloan, NBA All-Star player and coach for Chicago Bulls, coach of Utah Jazz, member of Hall of Fame
Jeff Sluman, pro golfer (born in New York)
Albion W. Small, sociologist and university professor (born in Maine)
Len Small, state treasurer and 1921–29 Governor of Illinois
Mike Small, pro golfer and coach
The Smashing Pumpkins, rock band from Chicago
Anne Smedinghoff, diplomat killed in Afghanistan
Ralph C. Smedley, founder of Toastmasters International
Adrian Smith, architect of Chicago's Trump Tower and Dubai's Burj Khalifa (world's tallest building)
Al Smith, basketball player in ABA 1971–75
Al Smith, MLB pitcher 1934–45
Art Smith, actor, In a Lonely Place, Ride the Pink Horse, Body and Soul
Frank L. Smith, U.S. Representative 1919–21
Giles Alexander Smith, Civil War general, politician (born in New York)
H. Allen Smith, journalist and humorist, Rhubarb
Hal Smith, catcher for 1960 World Series champion Pittsburgh Pirates
Hamilton O. Smith, microbiologist, 1978 Nobel Prize (born in New York)
Harry Smith, television news journalist
Henry Justin Smith, editor of Chicago Daily News
Jack Smith, MLB outfielder 1915–29
Jim Smith, wide receiver, won two Super Bowls with Pittsburgh Steelers
John C. Smith, Civil War general, politician (born in Pennsylvania)
John E. Smith, Civil War general, jeweler (born in Switzerland)
Joseph Smith, founder of Latter Day Saint movement (born in Vermont)
Kellita Smith, actress and model, The Bernie Mac Show
Lenzelle Smith Jr. (born 1991), basketball player in the Israel Basketball Premier League
Lonnie Smith, MLB outfielder, three-time World Series champion
Lyall Smith, sports editor and executive
Patti Smith, singer, songwriter and poet, Rock and Roll Hall of Fame
Pinetop Smith, jazz pianist (born in Alabama)
Ralph Tyler Smith, completed U.S. Senate term of Everett Dirksen
Ron Smith, defensive back for five NFL teams
Sally Smith, mayor of Juneau, Alaska 2000–03
Sandra Smith, reporter for Fox Business Network
Sidney Smith, cartoonist
Tangela Smith, player for WNBA's San Antonio Silver Stars
Theophilus W. Smith, law partner of Aaron Burr, impeached Illinois Supreme Court justice (born in New York)
Wendell Smith, sportswriter (born in Michigan)
Jake Smolinski, outfielder for Oakland A's
Henry Snapp, U.S. Representative 1871–73 (born in New York)
Howard M. Snapp, U.S. Representative 1903–11 (born in New York)
Phoebe Snetsinger, bird watcher
Brian Snitker, manager for the Atlanta Braves
Carrie Snodgress, Oscar-nominated actress, Diary of a Mad Housewife, The Fury, Murphy's Law, Pale Rider
Esther Snyder, co-founder of In-N-Out Burger
Jimmy Snyder, auto racer, runner-up in 1939 Indianapolis 500
Martin Snyder, gangster, husband of Ruth Etting
Ted Snyder, songwriter, "Who's Sorry Now?"

So–Ss

Carol Sobieski, screenwriter, Annie, Fried Green Tomatoes, Casey's Shadow, Sarah, Plain and Tall
Ron Sobie, basketball player for DePaul, New York Knicks
Susan Solomon, chemist, MIT professor, Nobel Prize winner
Joey Soloway, TV and film writer, director
Georg Solti, conductor of Chicago Symphony Orchestra 1969–91 (born in Hungary)
Rafael Sorkin, physicist
Sammy Sosa, outfielder for White Sox and Cubs from 1989 to 2004 (born in Dominican Republic)
David Soul, actor, Starsky and Hutch, Here Come the Brides, The Yellow Rose; singer, "Don't Give Up on Us"
Olan Soule, actor
Soulja Boy, rapper
Eddie South, jazz violinist (born in Missouri)
Pete Souza, official White House photographer for Presidents Reagan and Obama (born in Massachusetts)
Judy Sowinski, skater in Roller Derby
Brock Spack, football coach, Illinois State
Vince Spadea, tennis player
Horatio Spafford, lawyer, hymn composer (born in New York)
Albert Spalding, athlete, co-founder of Spalding sporting goods
John Spalding, Roman Catholic Bishop and co-founder of The Catholic University of America
William A.J. Sparks, U.S. Representative 1875–83 (born in Indiana)
Graham Spanier, president of Penn State University (born in South Africa)
Muggsy Spanier, jazz musician
Otis Spann, pianist in Blues Hall of Fame (born in Mississippi)
Jeff Speakman, martial artist, actor, The Perfect Weapon
Richard Speck, mass murderer
Dave Spector, Japan television personality
Jonathan Spector, soccer player for Birmingham City F.C.
Mac Speedie, wide receiver for Cleveland Browns 1946–52, head coach for Denver Broncos 1964–66
Donald Spero, physicist, Olympic rower
Lawrence Sperry, aviation pioneer
August Spies, convicted anarchist of Haymarket affair (born in Germany)
Ed Spiezio, infielder for St. Louis Cardinals and San Diego Padres
Scott Spiezio, infielder for four Major League teams; 2002, 2006 World Series champion
Anthony Spilotro, mobster and enforcer for Chicago Outfit
Alfred Henry Spink, founder of The Sporting News (born in Canada)
Scipio Spinks, MLB pitcher 1969–73
Jim Spivey, middle-distance runner, three-time Olympian
Paul Splittorff, pitcher for Kansas City Royals 1970–84 (born in Indiana)
Erik Spoelstra, head coach for two-time NBA champion Miami Heat
Viola Spolin, drama and improv teacher
George Kirke Spoor, film industry pioneer
Jerry Springer, Chicago-based TV personality (born in England)
William L. Springer, U.S. Representative 1951–73
William M. Springer, U.S. Representative 1875–95 (born in Indiana)
June Squibb, Oscar-nominated actress, Nebraska, About Schmidt

Sta–Std

Dewayne Staats, sportscaster (born in Missouri)
Brian Stack, comedy writer
Eddie Stack, MLB pitcher 1910–14
Marv Staehle, infielder for Chicago White Sox 1964–67
Jimmy Stafford, lead guitarist for Train
Michelle Stafford, actress, The Young and the Restless
Amos Alonzo Stagg, College Hall of Fame football coach and athlete, creator of the lateral pass and helmet
Amos Alonzo Stagg Jr., college football player and coach
Paul Stagg, college football player and coach
Jake Stahl, MLB player and manager, 1912 World Series
Larry Stahl, outfielder for four MLB teams
Michael Stahl-David, actor, The Black Donnellys, Cloverfield
A.E. Staley, food mogul, founder of football's Decatur Staleys (who became Chicago Bears)
Harry Staley, MLB pitcher 1888–95
Kevin Stallings, basketball head coach for Vanderbilt
Dino Stamatopoulos, comedy writer, actor, producer
Lee Stange, pitcher for four MLB teams
Don Stanhouse, pitcher for four MLB teams
Pete Stanicek, MLB player
Steve Stanicek, MLB player
Aileen Stanley, early 20th-century singer
Dolph Stanley, basketball coach
Florence Stanley, actress, Fiddler on the Roof, Fish
Louise Stanley, actress, Sky Bandits, Yukon Flight
Walter Stanley, NFL wide receiver
The Staple Singers, gospel group, Grammy Lifetime Achievement Award
Mavis Staples, gospel singer
Tim Stapleton, NHL center 2008–12
Ellen Gates Starr, social reformer and co-founder of Hull House
Helen Ekin Starrett, president, Illinois Woman's Press Association 
Vincent Starrett, early 20th-century journalist
Todd Stashwick, actor, The Riches
Harry Statham, college basketball coach
Jigger Statz, MLB outfielder 1919–28

Ste–Stn

Jack Steadman, president, general manager of NFL's Kansas City Chiefs
Steamboat Willie, Dixieland jazz musician
Myrtle Stedman, singer and actress
Claude Steele, provost at Columbia, University of California
Dan Steele, two-time Olympian in bobsled, NCAA champion hurdler
Shelby Steele, columnist, documentary filmmaker, author of White Guilt
Miriam Steever, pro tennis player
Walter Steffen, All-American quarterback, University of Chicago
Cindy Stein, women's basketball coach, Missouri and Southern Illinois
James R. Stein, TV writer and producer, America 2-Night, Fernwood 2 Night, Son of the Beach
Jill Stein, physician, activist, Green Party politician
Eric Steinbach, NFL offensive lineman 2003–12
Jack Steinberger, physicist, Nobel Prize winner
Ruth Ann Steinhagen, shot ballplayer Eddie Waitkus, inspired The Natural
John Henry Stelle, lieutenant governor 1937–40, briefly Governor of Illinois
Rick Stelmaszek, catcher and bullpen coach for Minnesota Twins
Dutch Sternaman, football player, co-owner of Decatur Staleys (who became Chicago Bears)
Joey Sternaman, 1920s pro football quarterback
Marilee Stepan, swimmer, 1952 Olympic bronze medalist
Donald Stephens, 13-term mayor of Rosemont, Illinois
Michael Stephens, pro soccer player
Benjamin Stephenson, militia commander, politician, writer of state constitution (born in Pennsylvania)
John Allen Sterling, U.S. Representative 1903–18
Thomas Sterling, Springfield attorney, U.S. Senator of South Dakota 1913–25 (born in Ohio)
Lee Stern, six-decade member of Chicago Board of Trade, founder-president of Chicago Sting pro soccer
Dodie Stevens, singer, "Pink Shoe Laces"
Fisher Stevens, actor, producer, director, Early Edition, Key West, Short Circuit, Stand Up Guys
John Paul Stevens, attorney, Supreme Court Justice 1975–2010, third-longest tenure in court's history
Adlai Stevenson I, Illinois congressman, U.S. postmaster general, 23rd Vice President of the United States 1893–97 (born in Kentucky)
Adlai Stevenson II, attorney, politician (Democrat) Governor of Illinois, Ambassador to the United Nations, presidential candidate in 1952 and 1956 (born in California)
Adlai Stevenson III, politician (Democrat), congressman and U.S. Senator from Illinois 1970–81
Lewis Stevenson, Illinois secretary of state 1914–17, father of Adlai Stevenson II
McLean Stevenson, actor, M*A*S*H, Hello, Larry, The Doris Day Show
William Stevenson, Olympic gold medalist, college president, ambassador
Helen J. Stewart, pioneer, postmaster of Las Vegas
James B. Stewart, journalist, 1988 Pulitzer Prize
Levi Stewart, Mormon pioneer, associate of Brigham Young
Lynn D. Stewart, lineman for Illinois in 1964 Rose Bowl, co-founder of Hooters restaurants
David Ogden Stiers, actor, orchestral conductor; M*A*S*H, The Dead Zone, Doc Hollywood, Better Off Dead
Isaiah Stillman, militia commander, Black Hawk War (born in Massachusetts)
Darryl Stingley, NFL receiver, left quadriplegic by injury
Howard St. John, actor, Born Yesterday, Li'l Abner, One, Two, Three

Sto–Stz

Barbara Stock, actress, Spenser: For Hire
Frederick Stock, 37-year director of Chicago Symphony Orchestra (born in Germany)
Milt Stock, MLB third baseman 1913–26
James Stockdale, one of U.S. Navy's most highly decorated officers, 1992 vice-presidential candidate
Dejan Stojanović, poet, writer, essayist (born in Serbia)
Johnny Stompanato, gangster, killed by daughter of Lana Turner
Cynthia Stone, actress, wife of Jack Lemmon
Dean Stone, pitcher for six MLB teams
Melville E. Stone, publisher, founder of Chicago Daily News, manager of Associated Press
Steve Stone, pitcher and broadcaster, Cubs and White Sox (born in Ohio)
W. Clement Stone, philanthropist, self-help author
Steve Stonebreaker, NFL linebacker 1962–68
Bill Stoneman, pitcher for Montreal Expos, general manager of Los Angeles Angels
Wilbur F. Storey, journalist (born in Vermont)
Hannah Storm, ESPN sportscaster
Lauren Storm, actress, Flight 29 Down
John Stossel, consumer reporter, investigative journalist, author
Jean Stothert, mayor of Omaha, Nebraska
Shirley Stovroff, pro baseball player
Otto Stowe, NFL wide receiver 1971–74
Michael Stoyanov, actor, TV comedy writer, Blossom
Win Stracke, folk musician
Hank Stram, Pro Football Hall of Fame coach of Kansas City Chiefs
William Stratton, Governor of Illinois 1953–61
Michael W. Straus, editor, director of U.S. reclamation under Harry Truman
The Brothers Strause, directing duo, special effects artists
Kevin Streelman, pro golfer
Tai Streets, Michigan football and basketball player, San Francisco 49ers wide receiver
Steve Stricker, pro golfer, University of Illinois player (born in Wisconsin)
Lee Strobel, Christian apologetic author
John Stroger, president of Cook County Commissioners 1994–2006
Cal Strong, Olympic water polo medalist
Cecily Strong, comedian, Saturday Night Live
Barbara Stuart, television actress
John Stuart, CEO of Quaker Oats
John T. Stuart, law partner of Abe Lincoln, U.S. Representative (born in Kentucky)
R. Douglas Stuart, U.S. ambassador to Canada
R. Douglas Stuart Jr., executive of Quaker Oats, ambassador to Norway
Andy Studebaker, NFL linebacker
Mary Lou Studnicka, player in All-American Girls Baseball League
James J. Stukel, university president
Patrick Stump, lead singer of band Fall Out Boy
John Sturges, Oscar-nominated film director, The Magnificent Seven, Gunfight at the O.K. Corral, The Great Escape
Preston Sturges, director and Oscar-winning screenwriter, The Lady Eve, Sullivan's Travels, The Miracle of Morgan's Creek

Su–Sz

Todd Sucherman, drummer for Styx
Bill Sudakis, infielder for six Major League teams
Margaret Ashmore Sudduth, educator, editor, social reformer 
Harry Sukman, Oscar-winning composer
Billy Sullivan Jr., MLB catcher 1931–47
Gerry Sullivan, offensive lineman for Cleveland Browns 1974–81
Joe Sullivan, MLB pitcher 1935–41
Louis Sullivan, architect (born in Massachusetts)
McKey Sullivan, fashion model, winner of America’s Next Top Model Cycle 11
Mike Sullivan, NFL lineman and coach
Hope Summers, actress, The Andy Griffith Show
Billy Sunday, ballplayer and evangelist (born in Iowa)
Jim Sundberg, MLB catcher 1974–89, six Gold Glove Awards
Eliza R. Sunderland, writer, educator, lecturer, women's rights advocate 
Don Sundquist, Governor of Tennessee 1995–2003
Daniel Sunjata, actor, Rescue Me, Law & Order: Special Victims Unit, The Devil Wears Prada
Tom Sunkel, MLB pitcher 1937–44
Evar Swanson, MLB outfielder 1929–34
Gloria Swanson, Oscar-nominated, Golden Globe-winning actress, Sunset Boulevard, The Trespasser, Airport 1975
Gladys Swarthout, opera singer (born in Missouri)
Aaron Swartz, computer programmer, writer
Ed Sweeney, MLB catcher 1908–1919
Blanche Sweet, actress, Anna Christie
Lynn Sweet, Washington bureau chief, Chicago Sun-Times
Nancy Swider-Peltz, speed skater, four-time Olympian
George Bell Swift, two-term Mayor of Chicago (born in Ohio)
Gustavus Franklin Swift, meat-packing entrepreneur, founder of Swift & Co. (born in Massachusetts)
Emerson Swinford, musician
Bob Swisher, running back for Chicago Bears 1938–41
Ann Swisshelm, 2014 Olympian in curling
Carl Switzer, actor, "Alfalfa" in Our Gang comedies
Ken Swofford, actor, Ellery Queen, Murder, She Wrote
Keith Szarabajka, actor, The Dark Knight, We Were Soldiers
Stan Szukala, pro basketball player

T
Ta–Tg
 

Lorado Taft, sculptor
Joe Tait, sportscaster for Cleveland Cavaliers
Carlos Talbott, U.S. Air Force general
Maria Tallchief, ballerina, Chicago Lyric Opera director (born in Oklahoma)
Jill Talley, actress, Little Miss Sunshine, The Boondocks, Mr. Show
Shel Talmy, 1960s record producer, songwriter, arranger
Tampa Red, musician in Blues Hall of Fame (born in Georgia)
Daniel M. Tani, astronaut (born in Pennsylvania)
Bazy Tankersley, horse breeder and publisher
Antwon Tanner, actor, One Tree Hill
John Riley Tanner, Governor of Illinois 1897–1901 (born in Indiana)
Joseph R. Tanner, astronaut
Dorothea Tanning, artist
Lawrence Tanter, public address announcer, Los Angeles Lakers
El Tappe, catcher and coach for Chicago Cubs
Bill Tate, MVP of 1952 Rose Bowl, head coach at Wake Forest
Larenz Tate, actor, Dead Presidents, Menace II Society, Why Do Fools Fall in Love, Ray, The Postman
Mark Tatge, journalist
Mike Tauchman (born 1990), outfielder for the San Francisco Giants of Major League Baseball
Norman Taurog, director of Martin and Lewis, Elvis Presley films
Bert Leston Taylor, librettist and columnist (born in Massachusetts)
Billy Taylor, basketball coach, Lehigh and Ball State
Eddie Taylor, guitarist in Blues Hall of Fame (born in Mississippi)
Edmund Dick Taylor, coal miner, politician, "Father of the Greenback" (born in Virginia)
George A. Taylor, World War II general, led Omaha Beach landing
Hawk Taylor, catcher for four MLB teams
Joan Taylor, actress, 20 Million Miles to Earth, War Paint, The Rifleman
Josh Taylor, actor, Days of Our Lives
June Taylor, choreographer, The Jackie Gleason Show
Koko Taylor, singer (born in Tennessee)
Lili Taylor, actress, Six Feet Under, I Shot Andy Warhol, Mystic Pizza, Ransom, The Conjuring
Robert Lewis Taylor, author, 1959 Pulitzer Prize
Samuel A. Taylor, screenwriter, Sabrina, Vertigo
Margaret Taylor-Burroughs, artist, museum founder, parks commissioner (born in Louisiana)
Edwin Way Teale, naturalist and Pulitzer Prize-winning writer
Gus Tebell, football coach, NC State, Virginia
Barbara Ann Teer, founder of National Black Theatre
Len Teeuws, lineman for NFL's Rams and Cardinals
Rick Telander, sportswriter for Sports Illustrated and Chicago Sun-Times
Andy Tennant, actor, writer, film director, Hitch, Sweet Home Alabama, The Bounty Hunter
Judy Tenuta, comedian
Studs Terkel, historian, journalist, Pulitzer Prize-winning author and actor, Eight Men Out
Ernie Terrell, heavyweight contender, Chicago boxing promoter (born in Mississippi)
Felisha Terrell, actress, Days of Our Lives
Jean Terrell, singer with The Supremes
Frank Teschemacher, jazz musician (born in Missouri)
Tim Tetrick, harness racing driver, won 2012 Hambletonian Stakes

Th–Tn

John Thain, CEO of Merrill Lynch, New York Stock Exchange
Tom Thayer, offensive lineman and radio commentator for Chicago Bears
Lynne Thigpen, actress, Where in the World Is Carmen Sandiego?, All My Children, The Paper, The District
Roy Thinnes, actor, The Invaders, The Long, Hot Summer, Airport 1975, The Hindenburg, Falcon Crest
Napoleon B. Thistlewood, Cairo politician (born in Delaware)
Josh Thole, catcher for Toronto Blue Jays
Bill Thomas, costume designer, 10 Oscar nominations
Deon Thomas, American-Israeli basketball player
Frank Thomas, Hall of Fame first baseman, DH for Chicago White Sox (born in Georgia)
Frazier Thomas, Chicago television personality (born in Indiana)
Isiah Thomas, Hall of Fame basketball player, coach, executive; NCAA champion Indiana, NBA champion Detroit Pistons
Jesse B. Thomas, one of state's first U.S. Senators (born in Virginia)
Lee Thomas, MLB player and executive
Pierre Thomas, running back for the Super Bowl XLIV champion New Orleans Saints
Pinch Thomas, MLB catcher 1912–21
Robert R. Thomas, justice on state Supreme Court since 2000, placekicker for Notre Dame and Chicago Bears (born in New York)
Theodore Thomas, violinist, conductor and founder of the Chicago Symphony Orchestra (born in Germany)
Jim Thome, MLB first baseman, DH 1991–2012, five-time All-Star
Don Thompson, president of McDonald's 2012–15
Fountain L. Thompson, U.S. Senator of North Dakota
James R. Thompson, politician (Republican), U.S. Attorney and four-term Governor of Illinois
Jeri Kehn Thompson, political commentator, wife of Sen. Fred Thompson (born in Nebraska)
Junior Thompson, MLB pitcher 1939–47
Marshall Thompson, actor, Dial 1119, Crashout, My Six Convicts, To Hell and Back, It!, First Man into Space
Patricia Thompson, television and documentary producer
William Hale Thompson, politician (Republican), two-term Mayor of Chicago (born in Massachusetts)
James Thomson, developmental biologist
Brad Thor, thriller novelist
Skip Thoren, basketball center for Illinois 1962–65
Don Thorp, defensive lineman, 1983 Big Ten MVP
Noble Threewitt, horse racing trainer
Richard Threlkeld, television journalist (born in Iowa)
Paul Tibbets, pilot of the Enola Gay, U.S. Air Force general
Eunice Tietjens, foreign correspondent
Pamela Tiffin, actress, One, Two, Three, The Pleasure Seekers, Harper, State Fair, Viva Max! (born in Oklahoma)
Charles Tillman, cornerback for Chicago Bears, Carolina Panthers
Burr Tillstrom, puppeteer, creator of Kukla, Fran and Ollie
Tom Timmermann, MLB pitcher 1969–74
Joe Tinker, Hall of Fame shortstop for Chicago Cubs (born in Kansas)

To–Tq

John Tobias, creator of Mortal Kombat video game
James Tobin, economist, 1981 Nobel Prize
Albert Tocco, organized crime figure
Beverly Todd, actress, Lean on Me, The Bucket List
Jonathan Toews, three-time Stanley Cup champion with Chicago Blackhawks (born in Canada)
JP Tokoto (born 1993), basketball player for Hapoel Tel Aviv of the Israeli Basketball Premier League
Gregg Toland, cinematographer, Citizen Kane
Scott Tolzien, quarterback for Green Bay Packers
David Tom, actor, The Young and the Restless, All My Children
Lauren Tom, actress and voice artist, King of the Hill, The Joy Luck Club, Futurama, W.I.T.C.H.
Nicholle Tom, actress, The Nanny, The Minor Accomplishments of Jackie Woodman, Her Only Child
Clyde Tombaugh, astronomer, discoverer of dwarf planet Pluto
Mike Tomczak, quarterback for four NFL teams
Darlene Tompkins, actress, Beyond the Time Barrier, Blue Hawaii
Mario Tonelli, football player, survivor of Bataan Death March
Judy Baar Topinka, politician (Republican), comptroller, state treasurer
Mel Tormé, singer, composer, actor, Grammy Lifetime Achievement Award, co-wrote "The Christmas Song"
Jorge Torres, NCAA cross-country champion
Johnny Torrio, organized crime figure (born in Italy)
Audrey Totter, actress, The Postman Always Rings Twice, The Set-Up, High Wall, Tension, Lady in the Lake
Cy Touff, trumpeter
Roger Touhy, organized crime figure
Tom Towles, actor
Andre Townsend, starter in two Super Bowls for Denver Broncos
Robert Townsend, actor and director, The Parent 'Hood, The Five Heartbeats, Hollywood Shuffle
Taylor Townsend, tennis player
Giorgio Tozzi, opera singer

Tr–Tz

Al Trace, songwriter and bandleader
George Trafton, Hall of Fame center for Chicago Bears
Jane Trahey, advertising executive
Mary Ellen Trainor, actress, Roswell, Parker Lewis Can't Lose, the Lethal Weapon films
Rick Tramonto, restaurateur
June Travis, actress, Circus Girl, The Case of the Black Cat
Sam Travis, MLB infielder
Sam Treiman, theoretical physicist
Les Tremayne, radio personality (born in England)
Ken Trickey, college basketball coach (born in Missouri)
Roswell Tripp, football player for Yale
Dick Triptow, pro basketball player and coach
Lennie Tristano, jazz pianist
Walter Trohan, journalist
Harry Trotsek, Hall of Fame thoroughbred trainer
Bill Trotter, MLB pitcher 1937–44
Charlie Trotter, restaurateur
Bobbi Trout, aviatrix
Jim True-Frost, actor, The Wire
Walter E. Truemper, pilot, World War II Medal of Honor recipient
Frankie Trumbauer, jazz saxophonist
Lyman Trumbull, politician (Democrat, Republican), Illinois Supreme Court Justice, U.S. Senator, author of Thirteenth Amendment (born in Connecticut)
Bob Trumpy, tight end for Cincinnati Bengals, sportscaster
Dennis Tufano, singer for The Buckinghams
Robin Tunney, actress, The Mentalist, Prison Break, The Craft, Hollywoodland, Vertical Limit
William Tuohy, Pulitzer-winning foreign correspondent
Barbara Turf, CEO of Crate & Barrel
Bob Turley, Cy Young-winning pitcher, primarily with New York Yankees
Bulldog Turner, Hall of Fame player for Chicago Bears (born in Texas)
Evan Turner, guard for Boston Celtics
Ike and Tina Turner, musical duo, began in East St. Louis
Jonathan Baldwin Turner, scholar, botanist, advocate of land grant universities (born in Massachusetts)
Keena Turner, linebacker for San Francisco 49ers, four-time Super Bowl champion
Michael Turner, NFL running back 2004–12
Stansfield Turner, admiral and CIA director
Scott Turow, author and lawyer, Presumed Innocent
Bill Tuttle, MLB outfielder 1952–63
Jeff Tweedy, musician with Wilco
Twista, rapper
R. Emmett Tyrrell Jr., founder, editor of The American Spectator

U

Peter Ueberroth, president of U.S. Olympic Committee, commissioner of Major League Baseball
Ted Uhlaender, outfielder for Minnesota Twins and Cleveland Indians
Tyler Ulis, basketball player for Phoenix Suns (born in Michigan)
Chuck Ulrich, lineman for Illinois 1952 Rose Bowl championship team and NFL's Chicago Cardinals
Jim Umbricht, pitcher for Houston Colt .45s
Kay Unger, fashion designer
Tim Unroe, MLB first baseman 1995–2000
Paul Unruh, 1950 All-America basketball player for Bradley
Al Unser, MLB catcher 1942–45
Del Unser, outfielder for six MLB teams
Phil Upchurch, jazz and R&B guitarist and bassist
Dawn Upshaw, Grammy-winning soprano
Calla Urbanski, pairs skater, two-time U.S. champion
Kraig Urbik, offensive lineman for Buffalo Bills
Brian Urlacher, 13-year linebacker for Chicago Bears, 8-time Pro Bowl selection (born in Washington)
Frank Urson, silent-film director, Chicago
Garrick Utley, television journalist

V

Richard B. Vail, World War I officer, U.S. Representative
Jerry Vainisi, general manager of Chicago Bears 1983–86
Jim Valek, football player, coach for Illinois
Darnell Valentine, NBA guard 1981–91
Elmer Valentine, founder of Whisky a Go Go and The Roxy Theatre
Vincent Valentine, defensive tackle for New England Patriots
Virginia Valli, silent movie actress
Egbert Van Alstyne, songwriter, "In the Shade of the Old Apple Tree"
John S. Van Bergen, architect
Al Van Camp, MLB first baseman, outfielder 1928–32
Danitra Vance, actress, Saturday Night Live cast member
Gene Vance, basketball player, athletic director for Illinois
Art Van Damme, accordionist (born in Michigan)
Christian Vande Velde, professional cyclist
James Oliver Van de Velde, second Bishop of Chicago (born in Belgium)
Shaun Vandiver, basketball player and coach
Carl Clinton Van Doren, author, 1939 Pulitzer Prize for biography
Mark Van Doren, professor, 1940 Pulitzer Prize for poetry
Wendelin Van Draanen, author of Sammy Keyes children's novels
Dick Van Dyke, actor, The Dick Van Dyke Show, Diagnosis: Murder, Bye Bye Birdie, Mary Poppins (born in Missouri)
Jerry Van Dyke, actor, comedian, Coach, The Courtship of Eddie's Father, My Mother the Car
Brian Van Holt, actor, Cougar Town, John from Cincinnati
Phillip Edward Van Lear, actor, Prison Break
Norm Van Lier, player and broadcaster for Chicago Bulls (born in Ohio)
Homer Van Meter, bank robber (born in Indiana)
Sander Vanocur, television news journalist
John M. Van Osdel, architect (born in Maryland)
Melvin Van Peebles, director, screenwriter, actor, composer
Jim Van Pelt, CFL quarterback
Todd Van Poppel, MLB pitcher 1991–2004
Samuel Van Sant, Governor of Minnesota 1901–05
Virginia Van Upp, writer, producer, Cover Girl, Gilda
Virginia Van Wie, golfer, 3-time U.S. Women's Amateur champion
Fred VanVleet, NBA point guard
Bruce Vaughan, golfer, winner of British Senior Open
Chico Vaughn, Southern Illinois and pro basketball player
Clarence Vaughn, NFL defensive back 1987–92
Govoner Vaughn, basketball player
Hippo Vaughn, pitcher for Cubs 1913–21 (born in Texas)
Vince Vaughn, actor, The Lost World: Jurassic Park, Wedding Crashers, Fred Claus, Psycho, The Break-Up
Eddie Vedder, lead vocalist for Pearl Jam
Bill Veeck, owner of Chicago White Sox, Cleveland Indians, St. Louis Browns, member of Hall of Fame
William Veeck Sr., sportswriter, president of Chicago Cubs
Nadine Velazquez, actress and model, My Name Is Earl, Flight
Rachel Veltri, actress and model
Robin Ventura, third baseman, manager for Chicago White Sox (born in California)
Rick Venturi, head football coach for Northwestern, defensive coordinator for four NFL teams
Mark Venturini, actor
Emil Verban, infielder for Philadelphia Phillies, St. Louis Cardinals
Jim Verraros, singer, Season 1 of American Idol
Dick Versace, basketball coach, Bradley and Indiana Pacers (born in North Carolina)
Izabela Vidovic, actress, singer, The Fosters, About a Boy
Vince Vieluf, actor, Love, Inc., Rat Race
Marjorie Vincent, news broadcaster and 1991 Miss America
Jory Vinikour, harpsichordist and conductor
Steve Vinovich, actor
Craig Virgin, distance runner, 3-time Olympian, winner of 9 Big Ten track titles and NCAA cross country
John Vivyan, actor, Mr. Lucky
Virgil W. Vogel, film and TV director
Rich Vogler, auto racer, five Indianapolis 500s
Deborah Voigt, opera singer
Mark Voigt, NASCAR driver
Bob Voigts, Northwestern football player and coach
Harry Volkman, 45-year Chicago television weather forecaster
Pete Vonachen, Minor League Baseball executive
Kevin Von Erich, professional wrestler
Edward Vrdolyak, politician, Chicago alderman 1971–87, convicted of fraud
George Vukovich, MLB outfielder 1980–85
Charles W. Vursell, sheriff of Marion County, Illinois, U.S. Representative 1943–59

W
Waa–Wam

The Wachowskis, filmmakers, the Matrix trilogy
Charles H. Wacker, city planner, director of Chicago World's Fair
Dwyane Wade, basketball player for Chicago Bulls, 3-time NBA champion with Miami Heat
Robert Wadlow, tallest man in U.S.
E. S. Wadsworth, merchant, railroad president (born in Connecticut)
Arthur L. Wagner, U.S. Army general
Audrey Wagner, pro baseball player
Gary Wagner, pitcher for Philadelphia Phillies 1965–69
Mike Wagner, defensive back for Pittsburgh Steelers, won 4 Super Bowls
Susan Wagner, financial executive, co-founder of BlackRock
Ken Wahl, actor, Wiseguy, The Wanderers, Fort Apache, the Bronx
Becky Wahlstrom, actress, Joan of Arcadia
Jerry Wainwright, basketball coach of DePaul 2005–10
Frank Wainright, tight end for four NFL teams
Dick Wakefield, MLB outfielder 1941–52
Tim Walberg, U.S. Representative of Michigan
Eliot Wald, TV and film comedy writer
Frank Waldman, screenwriter, The Party, Return of the Pink Panther
Randy Waldman, musician
Tom Waldman, screenwriter, High Time, Inspector Clouseau
Jim Walewander, MLB infielder 1987–93
Charles Rudolph Walgreen, founder of Walgreens
Albertina Walker, gospel singer
Antoine Walker, forward for five NBA teams
Bill Walker, MLB pitcher 1927–36
Chet Walker, forward for Bradley and Chicago Bulls (born in Michigan)
Clint Walker, actor, Cheyenne, The Dirty Dozen, Yellowstone Kelly, None but the Brave, The Night of the Grizzly
Dan Walker, Governor of Illinois 1973–77 (born in D.C.)
Darrell Walker, player for five NBA teams
Derrick Walker, tight end for three NFL teams
George W. Walker, auto designer, original Ford Thunderbird
June Walker, actress
Mysterious Walker, three-sport athlete, coach for University of Chicago (born in Nebraska)
Nella Walker, actress
Amy Wallace, author (born in California)
Chris Wallace, television journalist, Fox News Channel
David Foster Wallace, author (born in New York)
Henry Cantwell Wallace, U.S. Secretary of Agriculture 1921–24
Irving Wallace, author and screenwriter
Jean Wallace, actress, Jigsaw, The Big Combo
Martin R. M. Wallace, Union general in Civil War (born in Ohio)
Mike Wallace, Chicago radio-TV personality and CBS News journalist (born in Massachusetts)
Stan Wallace, defensive back for Chicago Bears 1954–59
W.H.L. Wallace, Union general in Civil War (born in Ohio)
Stephen Wallem, actor, Nurse Jackie
Hal Wallis, film producer, Casablanca, The Maltese Falcon, Gunfight at the O.K. Corral, Blue Hawaii, True Grit
Joe Wallis, MLB outfielder 1975–79
Laurie Walquist, quarterback for Chicago Bears 1924–31
Ed Walsh, pitcher and manager for Chicago White Sox, member of Hall of Fame (born in Pennsylvania)
Frank Walsh, pro golfer, 1932 PGA Championship runner-up
Matt Walsh, actor, Upright Citizens Brigade, Veep
Minnie Gow Walsworth, poet
Kevin Walter, NFL wide receiver 2003–13
Melora Walters, actress, Cold Mountain, Boogie Nights, Magnolia
Lloyd Walton, guard for Milwaukee Bucks 1976–80

Wan–Waz

Sam Wanamaker, film director and actor, The Spy Who Came in from the Cold, Superman IV, Guilty by Suspicion
Carl Wanderer, World War I hero, convicted murderer
Rudolf Wanderone, billiards' "Minnesota Fats" (born in New York)
Betty Wanless, baseball player
Aaron Montgomery Ward, retail businessman, creator of mail order catalog (born in New Jersey)
Arch Ward, journalist, creator of baseball All-Star Game and boxing's Golden Gloves
Wilbur Ware, jazz bassist
Marsha Warfield, actress, Night Court
Cy Warmoth, MLB player 1916–23
Mark Warner, politician (Democrat), governor and U.S. senator of Virginia (born in Indiana)
Vespasian Warner, Civil War soldier, U.S. Representative
Elihu B. Washburne, U.S. Secretary of State under Ulysses S. Grant (born in Maine)
Hempstead Washburne, Mayor of Chicago 1891–93
Dinah Washington, singer, 1993 inductee in Rock and Roll Hall of Fame (born in Alabama)
Harold Washington, first African-American Mayor of Chicago
Mark Washington, NFL defensive back 1970–79
Stan Wasiak, managed 4,844 minor-league baseball games
Ted Wass, actor, Soap, Blossom, Oh, God! You Devil, Sheena, Curse of the Pink Panther
Muddy Waters, blues musician and songwriter, Grammy Lifetime Achievement Award (born in Mississippi)
Maurine Dallas Watkins, Chicago reporter who wrote stage play Chicago (born in Kentucky)
Jody Watley, singer, songwriter, and record producer
Betty Jane Watson, singer and actress
Bobby Watson, actor
Deek Watson, original member of singing group The Ink Spots
James Watson, molecular biologist, geneticist, zoologist, co-discoverer of structure of DNA, winner of the Nobel Prize
Minor Watson, actor, Boys Town, The Jackie Robinson Story
William Watson, actor, Lawman, Chato's Land
May Theilgaard Watts, naturalist and writer
Bobby Wawak, auto racer
Ruby Wax, comedian, TV personality, Absolutely Fabulous, Girls on Top
Carol Wayne, actress, television personality, Heartbreakers
Nina Wayne, actress, Luv

Wb–Wg
 

Frank Wead, aviator and Oscar-nominated screenwriter
Betty, Jean and Joanne Weaver, sisters in All-American Girls Professional Baseball League
Buck Weaver, third baseman for 1917 World Series champion White Sox and 1919 "Black Sox" (born in Pennsylvania)
Jason Weaver, actor, Smart Guy, Thea
Bill Webb, coach, executive with White Sox
Richard Webb, actor, Out of the Past, Distant Drums
Wellington Webb, mayor of Denver, Colorado 1991–2003
Jon Weber, jazz musician, NPR host
Pete Weber, hockey broadcaster
Mary Webster, actress
Stokely Webster, impressionist painter
Tracy Webster, basketball coach
Reinhold Weege, comedy writer, creator of TV series Night Court
Charles Weeghman, businessman, built Wrigley Field, owned Chicago Cubs (born in Indiana)
D. A. Weibring, professional golfer
Tim Weigel, Chicago television broadcaster
Joseph "Yellow Kid" Weil, notorious con artist
Bob Weiland, pitcher for five MLB teams
Jane Weiller, golfer
Alvin M. Weinberg, nuclear physicist
Lawrence Weingarten, Oscar-winning film producer
Robbie Weinhardt, pitcher for Detroit Tigers
Phil Weintraub, MLB player, had 11-RBI game in 1944
Hymie Weiss, mobster, rival of Al Capone (born in Poland)
Lois Weisberg, created Chicago Blues Festival and Taste of Chicago
Burton Weisbrod, economist who pioneered the theory of option value
Mark Weisbrot, economist, columnist
Mark Weiser, chief scientist at Xerox PARC
Bob Weiskopf, TV writer, I Love Lucy
Michael T. Weiss, actor, The Pretender, The Legend of Tarzan
Robbie Weiss, 1988 NCAA tennis champion
Johnny Weissmuller, athlete and actor, 5-time Olympic swim gold medalist, star of Tarzan films (born in Hungary)
Raquel Welch, actress, One Million Years B.C., Fantastic Voyage, Bandolero!, The Last of Sheila, Myra Breckinridge
Jerry Weller, U.S. Representative 1995–2009
Judson Welliver, presidential speechwriter
Jon Wellner, actor, Henry Andrews on CSI: Crime Scene Investigation
Junior Wells, blues musician (born in Tennessee)
Randy Wells, pitcher for Chicago Cubs 2008–12
Marty Wendell, football player for Notre Dame
Joe Wendryhoski, NFL guard 1964–68
George Wendt, actor, Norm Peterson on television series Cheers
John Wentworth, politician (Democrat), U.S. Congressman, Mayor of Chicago and newspaper editor (born in New Hampshire)
Pete Wentz, bass player of Fall Out Boy
Dennis Werth, player for New York Yankees 1979–81
Jayson Werth, outfielder for Washington Nationals
Paul Wertico, drummer with Pat Metheny Group
Dallas West, billiards player
Kanye West, multiple Grammy Award-winning rap musician, songwriter, producer, entrepreneur, fashion designer, and actor; husband of reality TV star Kim Kardashian
Mary Allen West, journalist, editor, educator, social reformer 
Matthew West, Christian musician
Roy Owen West, U.S. Secretary of the Interior 1928–29
Helen Westerman, baseball player
Thomas D. Westfall, mayor of El Paso, Texas 1978–82
Edward Weston, photographer
Haskell Wexler, Oscar-winning cinematographer, producer, director
Jerrold Wexler, financier

Wh

Cora Stuart Wheeler, poet, writer, journalist, lecturer 
Loren E. Wheeler, mayor of Springfield, U.S. Representative
John Whistler, first commandant of Fort Dearborn (born in Ireland)
Betty White, Emmy-winning actress and comedian, The Golden Girls, The Mary Tyler Moore Show, The Proposal, Hot in Cleveland
Deacon White, baseball Hall of Famer (born in New York)
Frank White, 8th governor of North Dakota, 1921–28 U.S. Secretary of Treasury
Isaac White, 19th-century militia officer (born in Virginia)
Jesse White, politician, Illinois Secretary of State
John H. White, Pulitzer Prize-winning photographer
Maurice White, musician, founder of Earth, Wind & Fire
Michole Briana White, actress
Nettie L. White, stenographer, suffragist 	
Stephanie White, basketball player and coach
Verdine White, musician, original member of Earth, Wind & Fire
Wendy White, opera singer
Willye White, track-and-field athlete, five-time Olympian
Jerome Whitehead, center-forward for Marquette, six NBA teams
John C. Whitehead, banker, civil servant, chairman of the Lower Manhattan Development Corporation
Steven Whitehurst, author, poet, educator
Larry Whiteside, sportswriter, 2008 Spink Award winner
Samuel Whiteside, soldier and 19th-century member of U.S. General Assembly (born in North Carolina)
Richard A. Whiting, composer, "On the Good Ship Lollipop", "Hooray for Hollywood"

Wi

Al Wickland, MLB outfielder 1913–19
Richard Widmark, Oscar-nominated actor, Judgment at Nuremberg, The Alamo, Kiss of Death, Night and the City, How the West Was Won, Murder on the Orient Express
Scott Wike, U.S. Representative, assistant treasury secretary to Grover Cleveland (born in Pennsylvania)
Michael Wilbon, sports columnist, TV commentator, co-host of ESPN's Pardon the Interruption
Wilco, rock band from Chicago
Lee and Lyn Wilde, actresses, Twice Blessed, Campus Honeymoon
Tim Wilkerson, drag racer
Jeff Wilkins, center for Utah Jazz 1980–86
Steve Wilkos, television personality, The Jerry Springer Show, The Steve Wilkos Show
Bob Will, outfielder for Cubs 1957–63
George Will, conservative Pulitzer Prize-winning columnist, journalist, ABC news analyst, author
Alice Willard, journalist, editor
Frances E. Willard, suffragist, head of temperance union, Northwestern dean of women (born in New York)
Frank Willard, cartoonist, creator of Moon Mullins
Louise Collier Willcox, writer, editor, anthologist, translator
Walt Willey, actor, All My Children
Aaron Williams, forward for 10 NBA teams
Billy Williams, 15-year outfielder for Cubs, member of Hall of Fame (born in Alabama)
Brandon Williams, NFL tight end
Cynda Williams, actress, Mo' Better Blues, One False Move
Dick Anthony Williams, actor, Homefront, The Mack, Dog Day Afternoon
Frank Williams, guard for New York Knicks and Chicago Bulls
Jason Williams, linebacker for five NFL teams
Jesse Williams, actor, Grey's Anatomy, Lee Daniels' The Butler
Joe Williams, jazz and blues singer, Count Basie Orchestra (born in Georgia)
Joe Williams, collegiate and freestyle wrestler, 3-time NCAA champion
Kenny Williams, outfielder, executive for Chicago White Sox (born in California)
Kyle Williams, wide receiver for Denver Broncos
Mayo Williams, football player and music producer
Michelle Williams, R&B singer-songwriter, member of Destiny's Child, actress
Robin Williams, comedian and Oscar-winning actor, Good Will Hunting, Good Morning, Vietnam, Mrs. Doubtfire, Dead Poets Society, Night at the Museum, Mork & Mindy, Aladdin
Rip Williams, MLB player 1911–18
Ron Williams, CEO and chairman of Aetna Inc. 2006–11
Tex Williams, western swing musician
William E. Williams, 3-term U.S. Representative
Richard S. Williamson, diplomat in George W. Bush administration
Sonny Boy Williamson, blues harmonica musician (born in Tennessee)
Dave Willock, actor, What Ever Happened to Baby Jane?
Dave Wills, baseball broadcaster for Tampa Bay Rays
Art Wilson, MLB catcher 1908–21
Ben Wilson, murdered high school basketball star
Bobby Wilson, NFL tackle 1991–94
Dan Wilson, MLB catcher 1992–2005, Seattle Mariners Hall of Fame
Dooley Wilson, singer, "Sam" in Casablanca (born in Texas)
Gahan Wilson, cartoonist
George Wilson, NFL player and coach
George Wilson, NBA center, played in two NCAA title games (born in Mississippi)
Gretchen Wilson, country music singer
Hack Wilson, Hall of Fame outfielder for Cubs, record-breaking 191-RBI season (born in Pennsylvania)
James H. Wilson, Civil War general
Kenneth L. Wilson, president of United States Olympic Committee 1953–65, Big Ten commissioner 1945–61
Martez Wilson, linebacker for three NFL teams
Parke Wilson, MLB catcher of 19th century
Pete Wilson, politician, mayor of San Diego 1971–83, U.S. Senator 1983–91, Governor of California 1991–99
Richard G. Wilson, soldier, Medal of Honor winner
Thomas E. Wilson, founder of Wilson Sporting Goods (born in Canada)
Whip Wilson, actor in western films
William Warfield Wilson, 4-term U.S. Representative
Frank Wilton, football coach, Miami University 1932–41
Hal Wiltse, MLB pitcher 1926–31
Dorothy Wind, baseball player
William G. Windrich, Medal of Honor recipient from Korean War
Henry Haven Windsor, editor, founder of Popular Mechanics
Oprah Winfrey, iconic television host, actress, producer and media magnate (born in Mississippi)
Tommy Wingels, wing for NHL's San Jose Sharks
Clare Winger, science-fiction writer
Daniel Winkler, relief pitcher for the Atlanta Braves 
Roy Winsor, soap opera creator, Search for Tomorrow
Florence Hull Winterburn, writer, editor
Frank Winters, basketball coach
Nobby Wirkowski, CFL quarterback
Arthur Wirtz, owned Chicago Stadium, Chicago Blackhawks, Chicago Bulls, Detroit Red Wings
Bill Wirtz, 41-year president of Chicago Blackhawks
Rocky Wirtz, owner of Chicago Blackhawks
W. Willard Wirtz, U.S. Secretary of Labor under Presidents John F. Kennedy and Lyndon B. Johnson
Lindsay Wisdom-Hylton, WNBA player 2009–12
Al, Alvin and Whitey Wistert, members of College Football Hall of Fame
John Wittenborn, NFL kicker 1958–68
Tom Wittum, NFL punter 1973–77
Samuel Witwer, actor, Davis Bloome on Smallville

Wj–Wz

Rick Wohlhuter, runner, 1976 Olympic bronze medalist in 800 meters
Gary K. Wolf, author of novel adapted into Who Framed Roger Rabbit
Hillary Wolf, actress, judo player, Home Alone, Home Alone 2
Raymond Wolf, football coach for North Carolina, Florida and Tulane
Ross Wolf, MLB pitcher 2008–13
Garrett Wolfe, running back for Northern Illinois and Chicago Bears
Ian Wolfe, actor, Bedlam, Julius Caesar
Roger Wolff, MLB pitcher 1941–46
Violet Bidwill Wolfner, owner of NFL's Chicago and St. Louis Cardinals 1947–62
Benson Wood, Civil War officer, U.S. Representative (born in Pennsylvania)
Corinne Wood, first female lieutenant governor of Illinois
Elizabeth Wood, director of Chicago Housing Authority 1937–54 (born in Japan)
James N. Wood, director of Art Institute of Chicago 1979–2004
John Wood, Governor of Illinois 1860–61, founder of Quincy, Illinois (born in New York)
Kerry Wood, 10-year pitcher for Cubs (born in Texas)
Mike Woodard, MLB infielder 1985–88
Cliff Woodbury, auto racer, 3rd in 1926 Indy 500
Jim Woods, MLB infielder 1957–61
Ray Woods, first basketball All-American for Illinois 1915–17
Abe Woodson, NFL cornerback 1958–66 (born in Mississippi)
Bob Woodward, journalist for Washington Post, instrumental in Watergate scandal, co-author of All the President's Men
Neil Woodward, Naval officer, NASA astronaut
James Hutchinson Woodworth, U.S. Representative, Mayor of Chicago 1848–50 (born in New York)
John Maynard Woodworth, first U.S. Surgeon General (born in New York)
Collett E. Woolman, co-founder of Delta Air Lines
Ralph Works, MLB pitcher 1909–13
Stephen T. Worland, economist
Robert Wrenn, tennis player, one of Teddy Roosevelt's Rough Riders
Amy Wright, actress, The Accidental Tourist, The Scarlet Letter
Eric C. Wright, defensive back, four-time Super Bowl champion with San Francisco 49ers
Eugene Wright, bassist with Dave Brubeck Quartet
Frank Lloyd Wright, iconic architect, designer, writer and educator (born in Wisconsin)
Jeremiah Wright, retired pastor of Trinity United Church of Christ (born in Pennsylvania)
Joseph C. Wright, Oscar-winning art director
Julian Wright, pro basketball player
Margie Wright, softball Hall of Famer
Michael Wright, pro basketball player
Randy Wright, quarterback for Green Bay Packers 1984–88
Warren Wright Sr., owner of horse racing's Calumet Farm (born in Ohio)
P.K. Wrigley, chewing gum mogul, Chicago Cubs owner 1932–77
William Wrigley Jr., founder of Wrigley Company, majority owner of Cubs 1918–32 (born in Pennsylvania)
William Wrigley III, CEO of Wrigley Co., sold Cubs to Tribune Company
Jim Wulff, defensive back, 1956 Rose Bowl champion Michigan State
Vic Wunderle, archer, 2000 Olympic silver medalist
Alex Wurman, film and TV composer
Addie L. Wyatt, civil rights activist (born in Mississippi)
John Wyatt, pitcher for five MLB teams
Brooke Wyckoff, player for three WNBA teams
Victoria Wyndham, actress, Another World
Renaldo Wynn, player for four NFL teams
Marvell Wynne, MLB outfielder 1983–90
Johnny Wyrostek, MLB outfielder 1942–54

Y

Rick Yager, cartoonist
Kevin Yagher, special effects technician
Jimmy Yancey, jazz musician
Ron Yary, Hall of Fame offensive tackle, primarily with Minnesota Vikings
Richard Yates Sr., politician (Republican), U.S. Representative, U.S. Senator, Governor of Illinois 1861–65 (born in Kentucky)
Richard Yates Jr., politician (Republican), attorney, U.S. Representative, Governor of Illinois 1901–05
Sidney R. Yates, politician (Democrat), 49-year U.S. Representative
Leland B. Yeager, economist, expert on monetary policy and international trade
Charles Yerkes, financier, mass-transit developer (born in Pennsylvania)
Mary Agnes Yerkes, painter
Philip Yordan, Oscar-winning screenwriter, Detective Story, Johnny Guitar, The Harder They Fall
John J. York, actor, General Hospital, Werewolf
Bruce A. Young, actor, The Sentinel, Blink, The Color of Money
Bryant Young, defensive lineman for Super Bowl XXIX champion San Francisco 49ers
Buddy Young, NFL running back and College Football Hall of Famer
Chic Young, creator of comic strip Blondie
Clara Kimball Young, actress
Donald Young, professional tennis player
Ella Flagg Young, superintendent of Chicago schools 1909–1915 (born in New York)
Ernie Young, outfielder for five MLB teams, minor-league manager, 2000 Olympic gold medalist
Frank A. Young, sportswriter for Chicago Defender
James Young, musician with Styx
John Young, jazz pianist
Larry Young, MLB umpire
Richard M. Young, judge, U.S. Senator 1837–43
Robert Young, actor, Father Knows Best, Marcus Welby, M.D., Crossfire, Northwest Passage, Western Union
Roger Young, writer, director, Lassiter, The Squeeze
Victor Young, Oscar-winning composer, arranger, violinist, conductor; wrote "When I Fall in Love", "Around the World"
Zora Young, blues singer (born in Mississippi)
Robin Yount, Hall of Fame player for Milwaukee Brewers
Linda Yu, television newscaster (born in China)
Jay Yuenger, musician with White Zombie
Rich Yunkus, basketball player
Timi Yuro, singer, "Hurt"
Kateryna Yushchenko, former First Lady of Ukraine

Z

Florian ZaBach, musician and television personality
Courtney Zablocki, luge, fourth place at 2006 Turin Olympics
Jacob Zachar, actor, Greek
James Zagel, judge, novelist
Paula Zahn, journalist, TV personality, On the Case with Paula Zahn (born in Nebraska)
Timothy Zahn, science-fiction author
Naureen Zaim, model, actress, artist
Katalin Zamiar, martial artist, sportswriter, actress
Robin Zander, musician with Cheap Trick (born in Wisconsin)
Billy Zane, producer, director and actor, Titanic, The Phantom, Dead Calm, Only You, Sniper, Tombstone
Charles S. Zane, judge, associate of Abe Lincoln (born in New Jersey)
Lisa Zane, actress, L.A. Law, Biker Mice from Mars, Roar
John Zaremba, actor, I Led Three Lives, The Time Tunnel, Ben Casey
Agnes Zawadzki, figure skater, 2010 U.S. junior champion
Jed Zayner, professional soccer player
Tom Zbikowski, defensive back for Notre Dame and Baltimore Ravens
Larry Zbyszko, pro wrestler
Robert Z'Dar, actor, producer
Joe Zdeb, outfielder for Kansas City Royals 1977–79
Kara Zediker, actress
Stephen A. Zeff, accounting historian
John D. Zeglis, president of AT&T
Alfred Zeisler, film director
Fannie Bloomfield Zeisler, pianist (born in Austria)
Zeke Zekley, cartoonist
Pam Zekman, Pulitzer Prize-winning investigative journalist
Sarah Zelenka, world champion rower, 4th at 2012 Olympics
Sam Zell, real estate entrepreneur, Tribune Company chairman
Bob Zeman, pro football player and coach
Robert Zemeckis, film director, Forrest Gump, Cast Away, Who Framed Roger Rabbit, the Back to the Future films
Colleen Zenk, actress, As the World Turns
Warren Zevon, rock musician, singer-songwriter, "Werewolves of London"
Jeff Zgonina, defensive lineman for seven NFL teams
Howard Zieff, film and TV commercial director, The Main Event, Private Benjamin, My Girl
Florenz Ziegfeld, Broadway impresario, creator of Ziegfeld Follies
Alma Ziegler, pro baseball player
Brad Ziegler, pro baseball player (born in Kansas)
Zach Ziemek, Olympic decathlete
Benny Zientara, MLB infielder 1941–48
Lester Ziffren, screenwriter
Mike Zimmer, head coach of Minnesota Vikings
Frederick Hinde Zimmerman, banker and land owner
Jacob Zimmerman, editor, politician (born in Pennsylvania)
Mary Zimmerman, Tony Award-winning director (born in Nebraska)
Mary Beth Zimmerman, golfer, 4-time Women's U.S. Amateur champion
Bob Zimny, lineman for 1947 NFL champion Chicago Cardinals
Bud Zipfel, first baseman for Washington Senators
Patricia Zipprodt, costume designer 
Adrian Zmed, actor, TV personality, T. J. Hooker, Grease 2
Ben Zobrist, second baseman for the Chicago Cubs, 2-time World Series champion
Robert Zoellick, president of World Bank 2007–12
Rick Zombo, hockey player for Detroit Red Wings, St. Louis Blues
Chris Zorich, lineman for Notre Dame and Chicago Bears
Louis Zorich, actor, musician, Mad About You, Brooklyn Bridge
Anthony E. Zuiker, creator of CSI
Jim Zulevic, actor, comedian, radio host, TV writer
Robert Zuppke, football coach for University of Illinois 1913–41, College Football Hall of Fame (born in Germany)
Jack Zuta, organized crime figure
Edward Zwick, film director, Glory, The Last Samurai, Legends of the Fall, Love & Other Drugs, Defiance
Tony Zych, Major League Baseball pitcher

0-9

Montana of 300, rapper

See also

List of Illinois suffragists
Lists of Americans

References

Sources